2021 in sports describes the year's events in world sport.

Major sports news
In mountain running, the Gansu ultramarathon disaster in the Yellow River Stone Forest, China led 21 runners to die from hypothermia. The poor organization of this government-run race led to a national outcry on the regulations of the sport.
In sprinting, during the Olympics, Krystsina Tsimanouskaya criticised her Belarusian coaches for entering her in the 4 × 400 m relay, a distance she had never contested, without her consent, after others missed doping tests and were disqualified. Her coaches forced her to fly back to Belarus. She entered the Polish embassy in Tokyo and was granted a humanitarian visa. The International Olympic Committee revoked the accreditation of her coaches and expelled them from the Olympic Village.

World records
In chronological order
17 May: In swimming, Russian Kliment Kolesnikov broke the 50 metre backstroke world record at the 2020 European Aquatics Championships with a time of 23.93.
18 May: In swimming, Russian Kliment Kolesnikov broke the 50 metre backstroke world record at the 2020 European Aquatics Championships with a time of 23.80.
22 May: In swimming, Italian Benedetta Pilato broke the women's 50 metre breaststroke world record at the 2020 European Aquatics Championships with a time of 29.30.
13 June: In swimming, Australian Kaylee McKeown broke the women's 100 metre backstroke world record at the 2021 Australian Swimming Trials with a time of 57.45.
18 June: In athletics, American Ryan Crouser broke the shot put world record at the 2020 United States Olympic Trials (track and field) with a distance of 23.37 metres.
25 July: In swimming, Team Australia, consisting of Bronte Campbell, Meg Harris, Emma McKeon, and Cate Campbell broke the women's 4x100 metre freestyle relay world record at the 2020 Summer Olympics with a time of 3:29.69.
29 July: In swimming, Team China, consisting of Yang Junxuan, Tang Muhan, Zhang Yufei, and Li Bingjie broke the women's 4x200 metre freestyle relay world record at the 2020 Summer Olympics with a time of 7:40.33.
30 July: In swimming, South African Tatjana Schoenmaker broke the women's 200 metre breaststroke world record at the 2020 Summer Olympics with a time of 2:18.95.
31 July: In swimming, American Caeleb Dressel broke the 100 metre butterfly  world record at the 2020 Summer Olympics with a time of 49.45.
31 July: In swimming, Team Great Britain, consisting of Kathleen Dawson, Adam Peaty, James Guy, and Anna Hopkin broke the mixed 4x100 metre medley relay world record at the 2020 Summer Olympics with a time of 3:37.58.
1 August: In swimming, Team USA, consisting of Ryan Murphy, Michael Andrew, Caeleb Dressel, and Zach Apple broke the 4x100 metre medley relay world record at the 2020 Summer Olympics with a time of 3:26.78.
1 August: In athletics, Venezuelan Yulimar Rojas broke the women's triple jump world record at the 2020 Summer Olympics with a distance of 15.67 metres.
3 August: In athletics, Norwegian Karsten Warholm broke the 400 metres hurdles world record at the 2020 Summer Olympics with a time of 45.94.
4 August: In athletics, American Sydney McLaughlin broke the women's 400 metres hurdles world record at the 2020 Summer Olympics with a time of 51.46.
29 August: In swimming, American Coleman Stewart broke the short course 100 metre backstroke world record at the 2021 International Swimming League with a time of 48.33.
29 October: In swimming, Australian Kyle Chalmers broke the short course 100 metre freestyle world record at the 2021 FINA Swimming World Cup with a time of 44.84.
3 November: In swimming, Team Italy, consisting of Michele Lamberti, Nicolo Martinenghi, Marco Orsi, and Lorenzo Zazzeri broke the short course 4x50 metre medley relay world record at the 2021 European Short Course Swimming Championships with a time of 1:30.14.
6 November: In swimming, Hungarian Szebasztián Szabó tied the short course 50 metre butterfly world record at the 2021 European Short Course Swimming Championships with a time of 21.75.
7 November: In swimming, Belarusian Ilya Shymanovich tied the short course 50 metre breastroke world record at the 2021 European Short Course Swimming Championships with a time of 25.25.
7 November: In swimming, Team Netherlands, consisting of Kira Toussaint, Arno Kamminga, Maaike de Waard, and Thom de Boer broke the short course 4x50 metre mixed medley relay world record at the 2021 European Short Course Swimming Championships with a time of 1:36.18.
19 November: In swimming, Belarusian Ilya Shymanovich broke the short course 100 metre breaststroke world record at the 2021 International Swimming League with a time of 55.32.

Deaths

Competitions by month

Air sports

10 – 24 July: 5th FAI Junior European Gliding Championships in  Pociūnai
28 July – 6 August: 23rd FAI World Glider Aerobatic Championships and 11th FAI World Advanced Glider Aerobatic Championships in  Leszno
29 July – 7 August: 14th FAI World Advanced Aerobatic Championships in  Toruń
7 – 21 August: 36th FAI World Gliding Championships in  Montluçon – Guéret
9 – 21 August: 2020 FAI World Parachuting Championships in  Tanay-Kemerovo
2 – 8 October: 2021 FAI S World Championships for Space Models in  Buzău

Alpine skiing

FIS Alpine World Ski Championships 2021
 9 – 21 February: in  Cortina d'Ampezzo
 Super G winners:  Vincent Kriechmayr (m) /  Lara Gut-Behrami (f)
  Vincent Kriechmayr (m) /  Lara Gut-Behrami (f)
  Romed Baumann (m) /  Corinne Suter (f)
  Alexis Pinturault (m) /  Mikaela Shiffrin (f)
 Downhill winners:  Vincent Kriechmayr (m) /  Corinne Suter (f)
 Alpine Combined winners:  Marco Schwarz (m) /  Mikaela Shiffrin
 Parallel winners:  Mathieu Faivre (m) /  Marta Bassino &  Katharina Liensberger (f)
 Team Parallel winners:  (Sebastian Foss-Solevåg, Kristin Lysdahl, Kristina Riis-Johannessen, Fabian Wilkens Solheim, Thea Louise Stjernesund)
 Giant Slalom winners:  Mathieu Faivre (m) /  Lara Gut-Behrami (f)
 Slalom winners:  Sebastian Foss-Solevåg (m) /  Katharina Liensberger (f)

World Junior Alpine Skiing Championships 2021
 2 – 10 March: in  Bansko
 Super G winners:  Giovanni Franzoni (m) /  Lena Wechner (f)
 Giant Slalom winners:  Lukas Fuerstein (m) /  Hanna Aronsson Elfman (f)
 Slalom winners:  Benjamin Ritchie (m) /  Sophie Mathiou (f)

2020–21 FIS Alpine Ski World Cup
Men's
 5 & 7 December 2020: World Cup #1 in  Santa Caterina
 Men's Giant Slalom winners:  Filip Zubčić (No. 1) /  Marco Odermatt (No. 2)
 9 – 13 December 2020: World Cup #2 in  Val-d'Isère
 Men's Super G winner:  Mauro Caviezel
 Men's Downhill winner:  Martin Čater
 16 – 19 December 2020: World Cup #3 in  Val Gardena
 Men's Super G winner:  Aleksander Aamodt Kilde
 Men's Downhill winner:  Aleksander Aamodt Kilde
 20 & 21 December 2020: World Cup #4 in  Alta Badia
 Men's Giant Slalom winner:  Alexis Pinturault
 Men's Slalom winner:  Ramon Zenhäusern
 22 December 2020: WC #5 in  Madonna di Campiglio (Men's only)
 Me's Slalom winner:  Henrik Kristoffersen
 26 – 29 December 2020: WC #6 in  Bormio
 Men's Super G winner:  Ryan Cochran-Siegle
 Men's Downhill winner:  Matthias Mayer
 8 – 10 January: WC #7 in  Adelboden
 Men's Giant Slalom winners:  Alexis Pinturault (2 times)
 Men's Slalom winner:  Marco Schwarz
 16 & 17 January: WC #8 in  Flachau
 Men's Slalom winners:  Manuel Feller (No. 1) /  Sebastian Foss-Solevåg (No. 2)
 19 – 25 January: WC #9 in  Kitzbühel
 Men's Downhill winners:  Beat Feuz (2 times)
 Men's Super G winner:  Vincent Kriechmayr
 26 January: WC #10 in  Schladming
 Men's Slalom winner:  Marco Schwarz
 30 & 31 January: WC #11 in  Chamonix
 Men's Slalom winners:  Clément Noël (No. 1) /  Henrik Kristoffersen (No. 2)
 3 – 6 February: WC #12 in  Garmisch-Partenkirchen
 Men's Downhill winner:  Dominik Paris
 Men's Super G winner:  Vincent Kriechmayr
 27 & 28 February: WC #13 in  Bansko
 Men's Giant Slalom winners:  Filip Zubčić (No. 1) /  Mathieu Faivre (No. 2)
 3 – 7 March: WC #14 in  Saalbach-Hinterglemm
 Men's Downhill winner:  Vincent Kriechmayr
 Men's Super G winner:  Marco Odermatt
 13 & 14 March: WC #15 in  Kranjska Gora
 Men's Giant Slalom winner:  Marco Odermatt
 Men's Slalom winner:  Clément Noël

Women's
 21 & 22 November 2020: World Cup #1 in  Levi
 Women's Slalom winners:  Petra Vlhová (2 times)
 12 – 14 December 2020: World Cup #2 in  Courchevel
 Women's Giant Slalom winners:  Marta Bassino (No. 1) /  Mikaela Shiffrin (No. 2)
 16 – 20 December 2020: World Cup #3 in  Val-d'Isère
 Women's Downhill winners:  Corinne Suter (No. 1) /  Sofia Goggia (No. 2)
 Women's Super G winner:  Ester Ledecká
 28 & 29 December 2020: WC #4 in  Semmering
 Here, the Giant Slalom competition is cancelled.
 7 – 10 January: WC #5 in  St Anton am Arlberg
 Women's Downhill winner:  Sofia Goggia
 Women's Super G winner:  Lara Gut-Behrami
 12 January: WC #6 in  Flachau
 Women's Slalom winner:  Mikaela Shiffrin
 16 & 17 January: WC #7 in  Kranjska Gora
 Women's Giant Slalom winners:  Marta Bassino (2 times)
 20 – 24 January: WC #8 in  Crans-Montana
 Women's Downhill winners:  Sofia Goggia (2 times)
 Women's Super G winner:  Lara Gut-Behrami
 26 January: WC #9 in  Kronplatz
 Women's Giant Slalom winner:  Tessa Worley
 28 – 31 January: WC #10 in  Garmisch-Partenkirchen
 Women's Super G winners:  Lara Gut-Behrami (2 times)
 24 – 27 February: WC #11 in  Val di Fassa
 Women's Downhill winners:  Lara Gut-Behrami (2 times)
 Women's Super G winner:  Federica Brignone
 6 & 7 March: WC #12 in  Jasná
 Women's Slalom winner:  Mikaela Shiffrin
 Women's Giant Slalom winner:  Petra Vlhová
 12 & 13 March: WC #13 in  Åre
 Women's Slalom winners:  Petra Vlhová (No. 1) /  Katharina Liensberger (No. 2)

Mixed
 17 & 18 October 2020: World Cup #1 in  Sölden
 Giant Slalom winners:  Lucas Braathen (m) /  Marta Bassino (f)
 26 & 27 November 2020: World Cup #2 in  Lech/Zürs
 Giant Parallel Slalom winners:  Alexis Pinturault (m) /  Petra Vlhová (f)
 Women's Slalom winner:  Michelle Gisin
 3 – 6 January: WC #3 in  Zagreb
 Slalom winners:  Linus Straßer (m) /  Petra Vlhová (f)
 12 – 17 January: WC #4 in  Wengen
 Event cancelled.
 15 – 21 March: WC #5 in  Lenzerheide
 Downhill and Super G events here are cancelled.
 Slalom winners:  Manuel Feller (m) /  Katharina Liensberger (f)
 Giant Slalom winners:  Alexis Pinturault (m) /  Alice Robinson (f)
 Team Parallel winners:  (Kristina Riis-Johannessen, Leif Kristian Nestvold-Haugen, Kristin Lysdahl, Sebastian Foss-Solevåg)

2020–21 Citizen World Cup
 2 & 3 January: WC #1 in  Pontresina
 Event cancelled
 7 – 9 January: WC #2 in  Falcade/Moena
 Men's Super G winners:  Francesco Gatto (No. 1) /  Matteo Pradal (No. 2)
 Women's Super G winners:  Katrina van Soest (2 times)
 9 & 10 January: WC #3 in  Lenggries/Brauneck
 Event cancelled
 9 & 10 January: WC #4 in  Turnau
 Men's Slalom winners:  Michał Staszowski (No. 1) /  Filip Botka (No. 2)
 Women's Slalom winners:  Petra Hromcová (2 times)
 16 & 17 January: WC #5 in  Reiteralm
 Men's Giant Slalom winners:  Jakob Greber (No. 1) /  Max Greber (No. 2)
 28 – 31 January: WC #6 in  Passo San Pellegrino
 Men's Giant Slalom winner:  Jan Koula (2 times)
 Women's Giant Slalom winners:  Caroline Beauchamp (No. 1) /  Carlotta De Leonardis (No. 2)
 9 – 12 February: WC #7 in  Abetone
 Slalom winners:  Toby Case (m) /  Lisa Rodari (f)
 Giant Slalom winners:  Thomas Meraner (m) /  Camilla Furletti (f)
 18 February  20: WC #8 in  Sils/Furtschellas
 Men's Slalom winners:  Luc Herrmann (2 times)
 Women's Slalom winners:  Carlotta Maria Clara Marcora (2 times)
 20 & 21 February: WC #9 in  La Molina
 Giant Slalom winners:  Andrés García (m) /  Inês Araújo (f)
 Slalom winners:  Samuel Beso (m) /  Inés Sanmartín Arbones (f)
 1 – 3 March: WC #10 in  Hinterreit
 Men's Super G winners:  Luis Tritscher (2 times)
 Women's Super G winners:  Florentina Schnittler (No. 1) /  Chantal-Isell Laszlo (No. 2)
 6 & 7 March: WC #11 in  Espot
 Men's Slalom winners:  Aniol Torres Casas (No. 1) /  Alejandro Miquel (No. 2)
 Women's Slalom winners:  Inés Sanmartín Arbones (No. 1) /  Noelia Gasienica-Kotelnicka (No. 2)
 6 & 7 March: WC #11 in  Tschappina
 Men's Giant Slalom winner:  Martin-Luis Walch (No. 1) /  Dario Büschlen (No. 2)
 Women's Giant Slalom winners:  Selina Gadient (2 times)
 15 March: WC #12 in  Santa Caterina di Valfurva
 Super G winners:  Luca Resinelli (m) /  Flavia Lüönd (f)

2020–21 FIS Alpine Ski Europa Cup
 2 & 3 November 2020: EC #1 in  Obergurgl
 Men's Giant Slalom winners:  Raphael Haaser (No. 1) /  Julian Rauchfuss (No. 2)
 7 – 9 December 2020: EC #2 in  Zinal (Men's only)
 Men's Super G winner:  Ralph Weber
 Men's Alpine Combined winner:  Joel Lütolf
 Men's Giant Slalom winner:  Cyprien Sarrazin
 12 & 13 December 2020: EC #3 in  Cadipietra (Women's only)
 Women's Slalom winners:  Lara Della Mea (No. 1) /  Martina Dubovská (f)
 12 – 15 December 2020: EC #4 in  Santa Caterina di Valfurva (Men's only)
 Men's Downhill winners:  Maximilian Lahnsteiner (No. 1) /  Clemens Nocker (No. 2)
 16 & 17 December 2020: EC #5 in  Hippach (Women's only)
 Women's Giant Slalom winners:  Maryna Gąsienica-Daniel (2 times)
 17 & 18 December 2020: EC #6 in  Val di Fassa (Men's only)
 Men's Slalom winners:  Clément Noël (No. 1) /  Théo Letitre (No. 2)
 20 & 21 December 2020: EC #7 in  Andalo (Women's only)
 Women's Giant Slalom winners:  Mina Fürst Holtmann (No. 1) / Second here is cancelled.
 21 & 22 December 2020: EC #8 in  Altenmarkt (Men's only)
 Men's Super G winners:  Raphael Haaser (No. 1) /  Roy Piccard (No. 2)
 4 & 5 January: EC #9 in  Zinal (Women's only)
 Women's Super G winners:  Stephanie Jenal (No. 1) /  Lisa Grill (No. 2)
 6 & 7 January: EC #10 in  Val Cenis (Men's only)
 Men's Slalom winners:  Laurie Taylor (No. 1) /  Billy Major (No. 2)
 9 & 10 January: EC #11 in  Vaujany (Women's only)
 Women's Slalom winners:  Elsa Håkansson-Fermbäck (No. 1) /  Andreja Slokar (No. 2)
 14 – 17 January: EC #12 in  Crans-Montana
 Women's Downhill winners:  Jasmine Flury (No. 1) / Second here is cancelled.
 18 & 19 January: EC #13 in  Zinal (Men's only)
 Men's Super G winners:  Lars Rösti (No. 1) /  Joshua Mettler (No. 2)
 20 & 21 January: EC #14 in  Gstaad (Women's only)
 Women's Slalom winners:  Marie-Therese Sporer (No. 1) /  Andreja Slokar (No. 2)
 25 & 26 January: EC #15 in  Zell am See (Women's only)
 Women's Slalom winners:  Lena Dürr (No. 1) /  Zrinka Ljutić (No. 2)
 25 – 30 January: EC #16 in  Orcières-Merlette (Men's only)
 Men's Downhill winners:  Erik Arvidsson (No. 1) /  Victor Schuller (No. 2)
 Men's Super G winner:  Maximilian Lahnsteiner
 2 & 3 February: EC #17 in  Folgaria (Men's only)
 Men's Giant Slalom winners:  Semyel Bissig (No. 1) /  Timon Haugan (No. 2)
 2 & 3 February: EC #18 in  Krvavec (Women's only)
 Women's Giant Slalom winner:  Zrinka Ljutić
 6 & 7 February: EC #19 in  Berchtesgaden (Men's only)
 Men's Giant Slalom winners:  Dominik Raschner (No. 1) /  Stefan Brennsteiner (No. 2)
 9 – 11 February: EC #20 in  Santa Caterina di Valfurva (Women's only)
 Downhill winners:  Lisa Grill (2 times)
 13 – 15 February: EC #21 in  Berchtesgaden (Women's only)
 Giant Slalom winners:  Elisa Mörzinger (No. 1) /  Hilma Loevblom (No. 2) / (No. 3)
 18 & 19 February: EC #22 in  Hasliberg (Men's only)
 Men's Slalom winners:  Billy Major (No. 1) /  Ben Ritchie (No. 2)
 22 – 25 February: EC #23 in  Sella Nevea (Men's only)
 Men's Downhill winners:  Victor Schuller (No. 1) /  Erik Arvidsson (No. 2)
 27 & 28 February: EC #24 in  Oberjoch (Men's only)
 Men's Slalom winners:  Jonathan Nordbotten (No. 1) / Second Slalom competition is cancelled.
 27 & 28 February: EC #25 in  Livigno (Women's only)
 Giant Slalom winners:  Jessica Hilzinger (No. 1) /  Marte Monsen (No. 2)
 2 & 3 March: EC #26 in  Val di Fassa (Women's only)
 Women's Super G winners:  Jasmina Suter (No. 1) /  Iulija Pleshkova (No. 2)
 10 – 18 March: EC #27 in  Saalbach-Hinterglemm
 Downhill and Women's Super G events here are cancelled.
 Men's Super G winner:  Stefan Rogentin
 18 – 21 March: EC #28 in  Reiteralm
 Giant Slalom winners:  Hannes Zingerle (m) /  Marte Monsen (f)
 Slalom winners:  Alexander Steen Olsen (m) /  Charlie Guest (f)

American football

National Football League
 31 January: 2021 Pro Bowl 
 Cancelled.
 7 February: Super Bowl LV in  Tampa
 Tampa Bay Buccaneers (NFC) defeated  Kansas City Chiefs (AFC), 31–9, to win their second Super Bowl title.
 22–24 April: 2021 NFL Draft in  Cleveland
 9 September – 2 January 2022: 2021 NFL season

2020–21 NCAA football bowl games
 21 December 2020: Myrtle Beach Bowl in  Conway
  Appalachian State Mountaineers defeated  North Texas Mean Green, 56–28.
 22 December 2020: Famous Idaho Potato Bowl in  Boise
  Nevada Wolf Pack defeated  Tulane Green Wave, 38–27.
 22 December 2020: Boca Raton Bowl in  Boca Raton
  BYU Cougars defeated  UCF Knights, 49–23.
 23 December 2020: New Orleans Bowl in  New Orleans
  Georgia Southern Eagles defeated  Louisiana Tech Bulldogs, 38–3.
 23 December 2020: Montgomery Bowl in  Montgomery
  Memphis Tigers defeated  Florida Atlantic Owls, 25–10.
 24 December 2020: New Mexico Bowl in  Frisco
  Hawaii Rainbow Warriors defeated  Houston Cougars, 28–14.
 25 December 2020: Camellia Bowl in  Montgomery
  Buffalo Bulls defeated  Marshall Thundering Herd, 17–10.
 26 December 2020: First Responder Bowl  Dallas
  Louisiana Ragin' Cajuns defeated  UTSA Roadrunners, 31–24.
 26 December 2020: LendingTree Bowl in  Mobile
  Georgia State Panthers defeated  Western Kentucky Hilltoppers, 39–21.
 26 December 2020: Cure Bowl in  Orlando
  Liberty Flames defeated  Coastal Carolina Chanticleers, 37–34, after overtime.
 29 December 2020: Cheez-It Bowl in  Orlando
  Oklahoma State Cowboys defeated  Miami Hurricanes, 37–34.
 29 December 2020: Alamo Bowl in  San Antonio
  Texas Longhorns defeated  Colorado Buffaloes, 55–23.
 30 December 2020: Duke's Mayo Bowl in  Charlotte
  Wisconsin Badgers defeated  Wake Forest Demon Deacons, 42–28.
 30 December 2020: Cotton Bowl Classic in  Arlington
  Oklahoma Sooners defeated  Florida Gators, 55–20.
 31 December 2020: Armed Forces Bowl in  Fort Worth
  Mississippi State Bulldogs defeated  Tulsa Golden Hurricane, 28–26.
 31 December 2020: Arizona Bowl in  Tucson
  Ball State Cardinals defeated  San Jose State Spartans, 34–13.
 31 December 2020: Liberty Bowl in  Memphis
  West Virginia Mountaineers defeated  Army Black Knights, 24–21.
 1 January: Peach Bowl in  Atlanta
  Georgia Bulldogs defeated  Cincinnati Bearcats, 24–21.
 1 January: Citrus Bowl in  Orlando
  Northwestern Wildcats defeated  Auburn Tigers, 35–19.
 1 January: Rose Bowl in  Arlington
  Alabama Crimson Tide defeated  Notre Dame Fighting Irish, 31–14.
 1 January: Sugar Bowl in  New Orleans
  Ohio State Buckeyes defeated  Clemson Tigers, 49–28.
 2 January: Gator Bowl in  Jacksonville
  Kentucky Wildcats defeated  NC State Wolfpack, 23–21.
 2 January: Outback Bowl in  Tampa
  Ole Miss Rebels defeated  Indiana Hoosiers, 26–20.
 2 January: Fiesta Bowl in  Glendale
  Iowa State Cyclones defeated  Oregon Ducks, 34–17.
 2 January: Orange Bowl in  Miami Gardens
  Texas A&M Aggies defeated  North Carolina Tar Heels, 41–27.
 11 January: College Football Playoff National Championship at the  Hard Rock Stadium
  Alabama Crimson Tide defeated  Ohio State Buckeyes, 52–24.

Aquatics

 2021 FINA Diving World Cup in Tokyo, Japan.
2021 FINA Swimming World Cup.
 2021 FINA World Swimming Championships (25 m) in Abu Dhabi, United Arab Emirates.
TBD: 2021 World Para Swimming Championships.
TBD: 2021 FINA World Junior Open Water Swimming Championships
TBD: 2021 FINA World Men's Youth Water Polo Championships
2021 FINA World Women's Youth Water Polo Championships
2021 FINA World Junior Synchronised Swimming Championships
2021 FINA World Junior Diving Championships

Archery
 16–26 September: 2021 World Archery Championships in  Yankton, SD
 4–10 October: 2021 World Youth Archery Championships in  Perth
 2021 World Indoor Archery Championships
 2021 World 3D Archery Championships
 2021 World Para Archery Championship delayed until 2022

2021 Archery World Cup
 19 – 25 April: WC #1 in  Guatemala City
 17 – 23 May: WC #2 in  Lausanne
 22 – 27 June: WC #3 in  Paris

2020–21 Indoor World Series
 21 – 22 November 2020: Stage #1 (Worldwide Online)
 Recurve winners:  Felix Wieser (m) /  Jung-ah Oh (f)
 Compound winners:  Staš Modic (m) /  Sarah Prieels (f)
 Barebow winners:  Erik Jonsson (m) /  Cinzia Noziglia (f)
 18 – 20 December 2020: Stage #2 (Worldwide Online)
 Recurve winners:  Brady Ellison (m) /  Wi Nayeon (f)
 Compound winners:  Dave Cousins (m) /  Bayley Sargeant (f)
 Barebow winners:  Erik Jonsson (m) /  Lina Bjorklund
 15 – 17 January: Stage #3 (Worldwide Online)
 Recurve winners:  Brady Ellison (m) /  Jang Yoo-jung (f)
 Compound winners:  Jean-Philippe Boulch (m) /  Fátima Neri (f)
 Barebow winners:  Erik Jonsson (m) /  Lina Bjorklund
 12 – 14 February: Stage #4 (Worldwide Online)
 27 & 28 February: Stage #5 (Worldwide Online, finals, Only for teams)

Archery Americas
 8 – 14 March: City of Medellín World Ranking Event in  Medellín
 22 – 28 March: 2021 Pan American Archery Championships in  Monterrey

Archery Europe
 22–27 February: 2021 Archery European Indoor Championships in  Koper
 16–21 March: European Grand Prix in  Poreč
 6–11 April: European Grand Prix in  Antalya
 30 April – 9 May: European Para-Archery Championships 2021 + Tokyo Paralympics CQT in  Olbia
 17–22 May: European Youth Cup 1st leg in  Čatež ob Savi
 21 May – 6 June: 2021 Archery European Outdoor Championships in  Antalya
 5–11 July: Para-Archery European Cup 2021 – Tokyo Paralympic FQT in  Nové Město nad Metují
 2–7 August: European Youth Cup – 2nd leg in  Bucharest
 30 August – 4 September: European 3D Championships in  Maribor
 5–12 September: European Field Championships in  Zagreb
 9 & 10 October: Run-Archery European Cup in  Nové Město nad Metují

Arm wrestling
 24 November – 3 December: 2021 World Armwrestling Championship in  Bucharest

Association Football

FIFA

National Teams
 20 May – 12 June: 2021 FIFA U-20 World Cup in 
 21 July – 6 August: Football at the 2020 Summer Olympics – Women's tournament in 
 : 
 : 
 : 
 4th: 
 22 July – 7 August: Football at the 2020 Summer Olympics – Men's tournament in 
 : 
 : 
 : 
 4th: 
 Cancelled: 2021 FIFA U-17 World Cup in

Clubs
 1–11 February: 2020 FIFA Club World Cup in 
 In the final,  Bayern Munich defeated  Tigres UANL, 1–0, to win their second FIFA Club World Cup title.
  Al Ahly took third place by defeating  Palmeiras 0–0  (3–2) after penalties.
 9–19 December: 2021 FIFA Club World Cup in

UEFA

National Teams 

 2–14 May: 2021 UEFA Women's U17 Championship in  Faroe Islands Cancelled
 6–22 May: 2021 UEFA U17 Championship in  Cyprus Cancelled
 24 March – 6 June: 2021 UEFA U21 Championship in  Hungary and  Slovenia  defeated  1–0 to win their 3rd title.
 6–10 October: 2021 UEFA Nations League Finals
 7 July – 1 August: 2021 UEFA Women's Euro in  England Postponed to 6–31 July 2022
 30 June – 13 July: 2021 UEFA U19 Championship in  Romania Cancelled
 21 July – 2 August: 2021 UEFA Women's U19 Championship in  Belarus Cancelled

Clubs 

 7 October 2020 – 16 May: 2020–21 UEFA Women's Champions League (final in  Gothenburg)
 In the final,  Barcelona defeated  Chelsea, 4–0, to win their first UEFA Women's Champions League title.
 17 September 2020 – 26 May: 2020–21 UEFA Europa League (final in  Gdańsk)
 In the final,  Villarreal defeated  Manchester United, 1–1  (11–10 p), to win their first UEFA Europa League title.
 15 September 2020 – 29 May: 2020–21 UEFA Champions League (final in  Porto)
 In the final,  Chelsea defeated  Manchester City, 1–0, to win their second UEFA Champions League title.
 11 August: 2021 UEFA Super Cup in  Belfast
 In the final,  Chelsea defeated  Villarreal, 1–1  (6–5 p), to win their second UEFA Super Cup title.

CONMEBOL

National Teams 
 13 June – 10 July: 2021 Copa América in :  defeated  1–0 to win their 15th title.

Clubs 
 23 February – 20 November: 2021 Copa Libertadores
 16 March – 6 November: 2021 Copa Sudamericana
 7 April: 2021 Recopa Sudamericana  Defensa y Justicia defeated  Palmeiras, 4–3 on penalties after tied 3–3 on aggregate to win their first Recopa Sudamericana.
 30 September – 16 October: 2021 Copa Libertadores Femenina

AFC

National Teams 

28 April – 8 May: 2021 AFC Beach Soccer Asian Cup in  Thailand (cancelled)

Clubs 

 14 April – 27 November: 2021 AFC Champions League
 14 April – 26 November: 2021 AFC Cup
 7–12 November: 2021 AFC Women's Club Championship

CAF

National Teams 
 16 January – 7 February: 2020 African Nations Championship in  Yaoundé, Douala and Limbe
 In the final,  defeated , 2–0, to win their 2nd African Nations Championship.
  took third place.
 14 February – 6 March: 2021 Africa U-20 Cup of Nations in  Nouakchott and Nouadhibou
 In the final,  defeated , 2–0, to win their 4th African U-20 Cup of Nations Championship.
  took third place.
 11 June – 9 July: 2021 Africa Cup of Nations in  Cameroon was postponed to 9 January – 6 February 2022.

Clubs 

 12 February – 17 July: 2020–21 CAF Champions League Al Ahly SC defeated Kaizer Chiefs 3–0 to win their 10th CAF Champions League title.
 12 February – 17 July: 2020–21 CAF Confederation Cup  Raja Casablanca defeated  JS Kabylie 2–1 to win their second CAF Confederation Cup title.
 28 May: 2020 CAF Super Cup Al Ahly SC defeated RS Berkane 2–0 to win their seventh CAF Super Cup title.
 TBD: 2021 CAF Super Cup

CONCACAF

National Teams 

 10 July – 1 August: 2021 CONCACAF Gold Cup
 18–30 March 2021: 2020 CONCACAF Men's Olympic Qualifying Championship  and  qualified for the 2020 Olympic Games.

Clubs 

 6 April – 28 October: 2021 CONCACAF Champions League
 3 August – 15 December: 2021 CONCACAF League
 15 – 25 May: 2021 Caribbean Club Championship  Cavaly defeated  Inter Moengotapoe 2–0 in the final to win their first title.
 23 April –  May: 2021 Caribbean Club Shield Cancelled.

OFC

Clubs 

 TBD: 2021 OFC Champions League Cancelled

Athletics
 2021 World Athletics Indoor Championships in Nanjing, China. Postponed to 17–19 March 2023
  2021 World Athletics Cross Country Championships in Bathurst, Australia.
 2021 Skyrunning World Championships in Pyrenees, Spain.
 2021 IAU 50 km World Championships in Taipei, Taiwan.
2021 IAU 100 km World Championships
 2021 IAU 24 hours World Championships in Timișoara, Romania.
 1–2 May  2021 World Athletics Relays in Chorzów, Poland.
 2021 World Para Athletics Championships in Kobe, Japan. delayed until 2022
 30 July – 8 August   Athletics at the 2020 Summer Olympics in Tokyo, Japan
 17–22 August 2021  2021 World Athletics U20 Championships in Nairobi, Kenya.

2021 World Athletics Label Road Races
Elite
 31 January: Osaka International Ladies Marathon in  Osaka
 Winner:  Mao Ichiyama
 28 February: Lake Biwa Marathon in  Ōtsu
 Winner:  Kengo Suzuki
 5 March: Djibouti International Half Marathon in  Djibouti
 Winner:  Mo Farah

2021 World Athletics Indoor Tour
Gold
 29 January: Indoor Meeting – Karlsruhe in  Karlsruhe
 Women's 60 m winner:  Dina Asher-Smith
 Men's 400 m winner:  Marvin Schlegel
 Men's 800 m winner:  Elliot Giles
 Women's 1500 m winner:  Katharina Trost
 3000 m winners:  Bethwell Birgen (m) /  Beatrice Chepkoech (f)
 60 m Hurdles winners:  Wilhem Belocian (m) /  Nooralotta Neziri (f)
 Men's Long Jump winner:  Juan Miguel Echevarría
 Women's Triple Jump winner:  Liadagmis Povea
 Men's Pole Vault winner:  Renaud Lavillenie
 Women's Shot Put winner:  Auriol Dongmo Mekemnang
 2 February: Banskobystricka latka in  Banská Bystrica (Men's High Jump)
 Winner:  Gianmarco Tamberi
 9 February: Meeting Hauts de France Pas de Calais in  Liévin
 60 m winners:  Marcell Jacobs (m) /  Javianne Oliver (f)
 800 m winners:  Elliot Giles (m) /  Jemma Reekie (f)
 1500 m winners:  Jakob Ingebrigtsen (m) /  Gudaf Tsegay (f)
 3000 m winners:  Getnet Wale (m) /  Lemlem Hailu (f)
 60 m Hurdles winners:  Grant Holloway (m) /  Nadine Visser (f)
 Women's 2000 m Steeplechase winner:  Winfred Yavi
 Men's Long Jump winner:  Juan Miguel Echevarría
 Women's Pole Vault winner:  Holly Bradshaw
 Women's Shot Put winner:  Auriol Dongmo Mekemnang
 13 February: New Balance Indoor Grand Prix in  New York
 60 m winners:  Trayvon Bromell (m) /  Kayla White (f)
 Men's 200 m winner:  Noah Lyles
 300 m winners:  Jereem Richards (m) /  Gabrielle Thomas (f)
 400 m winners:  Michael Norman (m) /  Shaunae Miller-Uibo (f)
 Women's 500 m winner:  Olga Kosichenko
 800 m winners:  Donavan Brazier (m) /  Ajeé Wilson (f)
 Men's 1000 m winner:  Bryce Hoppel
 1500 m winners:  Oliver Hoare (m) /  Heather MacLean (f)
 2 Miles winners:  Justyn Knight (m) /  Elinor Purrier (f)
 3000 m winners:  Eric Holt (m) /  Dani Jones (f)
 Women's 60 m Hurdles winner:  Kendra Harrison
 Men's High Jump winner:  Trey Culver
 Women's Pole Vault winner:  Sandi Morris
 17 February: Copernicus Cup in  Toruń
 Women's 60 m winner:  Javianne Oliver
 Women's 400 m winner:  Femke Bol
 800 m winners:  Elliot Giles (m) /  Habitam Alemu (f)
 Men's 1500 m winner:  Selemon Barega
 Women's 3000 m winner:  Lemlem Hailu
 60 m Hurdles winners:  Grant Holloway (m) /  Christina Clemons (f)
 Women's Triple Jump winner:  Paraskevi Papachristou
 Men's High Jump winner:  Maksim Nedasekau
 Men's Pole Vault winner:  Sam Kendricks
 Men's Shot Put winner:  Michał Haratyk
 24 February: Villa De Madrid Indoor Meeting in  Madrid
 Men's 60 m winner:  Arthur Cissé
 Men's 400 m winner:  Pavel Maslák
 800 m winners:  Mariano García (m) /  Habitam Alemu (f)
 1500 m winners:  Selemon Barega (m) /  Hirut Meshesha (f)
 Women's 3000 m winner:  Gudaf Tsegay
 60 m Hurdles winners:  Grant Holloway (m) /  Nadine Visser (f)
 Men's Long Jump winner:  Juan Miguel Echevarría
 Women's Triple Jump winner:  Tori Franklin
 Women's Pole Vault winner:  Iryna Zhuk

Silver
 24 January: American Track League 1 in  Fayetteville
 60 m winners:  Trayvon Bromell (m) /  Blessing Okagbare (f)
 400 m winners:  Fred Kerley (m) /  Quanera Hayes (f)
 60 m Hurdles winners:  Grant Holloway (m) /  Tonea Marshall (f)
 Women's High Jump winner:  Vashti Cunningham
 Women's Pole Vault winner:  Megan Clark
 Men's Shot Put winner:  Ryan Crouser (World Record)
 31 January: American Track League 2 in  Fayetteville
 60 m winners:  Maurice Eaddy (m) /  Mikiah Brisco (f)
 200 m winners:  Jereem Richards (m) /  Shaunae Miller-Uibo (f)
 600 m winners:  Nicholis Hilson (m) /  Samantha Watson (f)
 Men's 800 m winner:  Bryce Hoppel
 Women's 1 Mile Run winner:  Heather MacLean
 Men's 60 m Hurdles winner:  Trevor Bassitt
 Women's Long Jump winner:  Kendell Williams
 Women's Pole Vault winner:  Sandi Morris
 Men's Shot Put winner:  Ryan Crouser
 31 January: ISTAF Indoor in  Düsseldorf
 60 m winners:  Arthur Cissé (m) /  Dina Asher-Smith (f)
 60 m Hurdles winners:  Damian Czykier (m) /  Nadine Visser (f)
 Women's Long Jump winner:  Malaika Mihambo
 Men's Pole Vault winner:  Armand Duplantis
 2 February: Banskobystricka latka in  Banská Bystrica (Women's High Jump)
 Winner:  Yaroslava Mahuchikh
 3 February: Czech Indoor Gala in  Ostrava
 60 m winners:  Oliver Bromby (m) /  Jamile Samuel (f)
 400 m winners:  Pavel Maslák (m) /  Cynthia Bolingo (f)
 Men's 800 m winner:  Jamie Webb
 1500 m winners:  István Szögi (m) /  Meraf Bahta (f)
 Women's 60 m Hurdles winner:  Pia Skrzyszowska
 Men's High Jump winner:  Tihomir Ivanov
 Men's Long Jump winner:  Radek Juška
 Men's Shot Put winner:  Tomáš Staněk
 Women's Pole Vault winner:  Tina Šutej
 5 February: ISTAF Indoor in  Berlin
 60 m winners:  Arthur Cissé (m) /  Maja Mihalinec (f)
 60 m Hurdles winners:  Aaron Mallett /  Christina Clemons (f)
 Women's Long Jump winner:  Malaika Mihambo
 Men's Pole Vault winner:  Ernest Obiena
 6 February: Perche Elite Tour in  Rouen
 Pole Vault winners:  Armand Duplantis (m) /  Holly Bradshaw (f)
 6 February: Meeting Metz Moselle Athlélor in  Metz
 60 m winners:  Devin Quinn (m) /  Javianne Oliver (f)
 200 m winners:  Ján Volko (m) /  Lieke Klaver (f)
 400 m winners:  Liemarvin Bonevacia (m) /  Femke Bol (f)
 800 m winners:  Eliott Crestan (m) /  Habitam Alemu (f)
 Men's 1500 m winner:  Selemon Barega
 Men's 3000 m winner:  Seán Tobin
 60 m winners:  Jarret Eaton (m) /  Oluwatobiloba Amusan (f)
 Men's Long Jump winner:  Maykel Massó
 Men's Triple Jump winner:  Andy Díaz
 7 February: American Track League 3 in  Fayetteville
 60 m winners:  Ronnie Baker (m) /  Blessing Okagbare (f)
 Women's 200 m winner:  Blessing Okagbare
 400 m winners:  Michael Cherry (m) /  Shamier Little (f)
 Women's 800 m winner:  Adelle Tracey
 Men's 1 Mile winner:  Takieddine Hedeilli
 60 m Hurdles winners:  Omar McLeod (m) /  Tiffany Porter (f)
 High Jump winners:  Shelby McEwen (m) /  Vashti Cunningham (f)
 Men's Long Jump winner:  Marquis Dendy
 Women's Pole Vault winner:  Sandi Morris
 21 February: American Track League 4 in  Fayetteville
 60 m winners:  Zach Jewell (m) /  Daryll Neita (f)
 Women's 200 m winner:  Allyson Felix
 Men's 300 m winner:  Asa Guevara
 400 m winners:  Wilbert London (m) /  Shamier Little (f)
 800 m winners:  Michael Saruni (m) /  Heather MacLean (f)
 60 m Hurdles winners:  Michael Dickson (m) /  Danielle Williams (f)
 Pole Vault winners:  Andrew Irwin (m) /  Olivia Gruver (f)
 Men's Long Jump winner:  Marquis Dendy
 Shot Put winners:  Ryan Crouser (m) /  Raven Saunders (f)
 27 February: All Star Perche in  Aubière
 Winners:  Renaud Lavillenie (m) /  Holly Bradshaw (f)

Bronze
 5 February: Hvězdy v Nehvizdech in  Nehvizdy
 High Jump winners:  Thomas Carmoy (m) /  Levern Spencer (f)
 Long Jump winners:  Reynold Banigo (m) /  Neja Filipič (f)
 Men's Shot Put winner:  Tomáš Staněk
 6 & 7 February: Tallinn Indoor Meeting in  Tallinn
 Men's Heptathlon winner:  Risto Lillemets
 Women's Pentathlon winner:  Adrianna Sułek
 7 February: PSD Bank Meeting in  Dortmund
 60 m winners:  Joris van Gool (m) /  Jennifer Montag (f)
 Women's 400 m winner:  Laura Müller
 800 m winners:  Andreas Kramer (m) /  Julia Swelam (f)
 1500 m winners:  Kumari Taki (m) /  Caterina Granz (f)
 Women's 2000 m Steeplechase winner:  Gesa Felicitas Krause
 60 m Hurdles winners:  Orlando Ortega (m) /  Eline Berings (f)
 Men's Pole Vault winner:  Ernest Obiena
 Women's Long Jump winner:  Khaddi Sagnia
 12 February: Orlen Cup in  Łódź
 60 m winners:  Mike Rodgers (m) /  Ewa Swoboda (f)
 60 m Hurdles winners:  Jarret Eaton (m) /  Christina Clemons (f)
 Women's High Jump winner:  Alessia Trost
 Men's Pole Vault winner:  Sam Kendricks
 Men's Shot Put winner:  Michał Haratyk
 13 February: CMCM Indoor Meeting in 
 Women's 50 m winner:  Floriane Gnafoua
 Women's 60 m winner:  Jennifer Montag
 800 m winners:  Collins Kipruto (m) /  Christina Hering (f)
 1500 m winners:  Charles Grethen (m) /  Josephine Chelangat Kiplangat (f)
 60 m Hurdles winners:  Andrew Pozzi (m) /  Ricarda Lobe (f)
 Men's High Jump winner:  Thomas Carmoy
 Women's Long Jump winner:  Hilary Kpatcha
 Men's Shot Put winner:  Bob Bertemes
 13 February: IFAM Gent Indoor in  Ghent
 60 m winners:  Kojo Musah (m) /  Rani Rosius (f)
 400 m winners:  Vladimir Aceti (m) /  Andrea Miklós (f)
 Men's 600 m winner:  Pierre-Ambroise Bosse
 800 m winners:  Benjamin Robert (m) /  Nadia Power (f)
 1500 m winners:  Vincent Kibet Keter (m) /  Elise Vanderelst (f)
 Men's 3000 m winner:  Isaac Kimeli
 60 m Hurdles winners:  Liam Van Der Schaaf (m) /  Teresa Errandonea (f)
 Long Jump winners:  Eusebio Cáceres (m) /  Filippa Fotopoulou (f)
 High Jump winners:  Tihomir Ivanov (m) /  Merel Maes (f)
 Pole Vault winners:  Cole Walsh (m) /  Tina Šutej (f)
 14 February: Meeting de l'Eure in  Val-de-Reuil
 60 m winners:  Mike Rodgers (m) /  Javianne Oliver (f)
 400 m winners:  Bachir Mahamat (m) /  Cynthia Bolingo (f)
 Women's 800 m winner:  Kudaf Tsegay
 1500 m winners:  Getnet Wale (m) /  Michelle Finn (f)
 60 m Hurdles winners:  Grant Holloway (m) /  Elvira Herman (f)
 Men's Long Jump winner:  Grégoire Villain
 Men's Triple Jump winner:  Hugues Fabrice Zango
 High Jump winners:  Sébastien Micheau (m) /  Iryna Herashchenko
 Men's Pole Vault winner:  Chris Nilsen
 24 February: Serbian Open Indoor Meeting 2021 in  Belgrade
 60 m winners:  Massimiliano Ferraro (m) /  Salomé Kora (f)
 400 m winners:  Robert Parge (m) /  Andrea Miklós (f)
 Men's 1500 m winner:  Mitko Tsenov
 60 m Hurdles winners:  Luca Trgovčević (m) /  Anamaria Nesteriuc (f)
 Long Jump winners:  Izmir Smajlaj (m) /  Ivana Španović (f)
 Women's High Jump winner:  Morgan Lake
 Men's Shot Put winner:  Armin Sinančević
 Men's Pole Vault winner:  Armand Duplantis

2021 World Athletics Continental Tour
Bronze
 6 February: International Track Meet in  Christchurch
 200 m winners:  Edward Osei-Nketia (m) /  Georgia Hulls (f)
 Women's 800 m winner:  Camille Buscomb
 Men's 1500 m winner:  Hamish Carson
 400 m Hurdles winners:  Cameron French (m) /  Portia Bing (f)
 Men's 3000 m Steeplechase winner:  Niam Macdonald
 Women's Long Jump winner:  Tegan Duffy
 Men's Triple Jump winner:  Andrew Allan
 High Jump winners:  Hamish Kerr (m) /  Keeley O'Hagan (f)
 Shot Put winners:  Jacko Gill (m) /  Valerie Adams (f)
 Discus Throw winners:  Connor Bell (m) /  Savannah Scheen (f)
 Hammer Throw winners:  Anthony Nobilo (m) /  Lauren Bruce (f)
 27 February: Sir Graeme Douglas International in  Auckland
 100 m winners:  Edward Osei-Nketia (m) /  Zoe Hobbs (f)
 400 m winners:  Hamish Gill (m) /  Jordyn Blake (f)
 Men's 800 m winner:  James Preston
 Women's 1500 m winner:  Camille Buscomb
 Men's 110 m Hurdles winner:  Tom Moloney
 Women's 100 m Hurdles winner:  Amy Robertson
 Men's Long Jump winner:  Felix McDonald
 Women's Triple Jump winner:  Anna Thomson
 Men's High Jump winner:  Hamish Kerr
 Pole Vault winners:  Ettiene Du Preez (m) /  Imogen Ayris (f)
 Shot Put winners:  Tom Walsh (m) /  Valerie Adams (f)
 Women's Javelin Throw winner:  Tori Peeters
 11 March: Canberra Track Classic in  Canberra
 100 m winners:  Rohan Browning (m) /  Hana Basic (f)
 400 m winners:  Alex Beck (m) /  Angeline Blackburn (f)
 800 m winners:  Peter Bol (m) /  Catriona Bisset (f)
 1500 m winners:  Jye Edwards (m) /  Linden Hall (f)
 Men's 110 m Hurdles winner:  Nicholas Hough
 Women's 100 m Hurdles winner:  Abbie Taddeo
 400 m Hurdles winner:  Chris Douglas (m) /  Lauren Wells (f)
 Long Jump winners:  Chris Mitrevski (m) /  Annie Mcguire (f)
 High Jump winners:  Joel Baden (m) /  Nicola McDermott (f)
 Javelin Throw winners:  Liam O'Brien (m) /  Mackenzie Little (f)

NACAC
 23 & 24 April: 2021 NACAC Cross Country Championships and 2021 Central American Race Walking Championships in  Guatemala City

NACAC Area Permit Meetings
 18 – 20 March: Spring Break Classic Invitational in  Carolina (APM #1)
 20 March: Velocity Fest #8 in  Kingston (APM #2)
 17 April: Velocity Fest #9 in  Kingston (APM #3)

EA Athletics
 13 February: Balkan U20 Indoor Championships in  Sofia
 60 m winners:  Beniamin Duicu (m) /  Zala Istenič (f)
 400 m winners:  Denis Simon Toma (m) /  Tatiana Kharashchuk (f)
 800 m winners:  Márk Fándly (m) /  Veronika Sadek (f)
 1500 m winners:  Devrim Kazan (m) /  Talida Sfârghiu (f)
 3000 m winners:  Emil Bezecny (m) /  Mădălina Sîrbu (f)
 60 m Hurdles winners:  Demir Ayetullah (m) /  Klara Koščak (f)
 Long Jump winners:  Gor Beglaryan (m) /  Mariia Horielova (f)
 Triple Jump winners:  Oleksandr Aiko (m) /  Jovana Gnjatović (f)
 High Jump winners:  Roman Petruk (m) /  Styliana Ioannidou (f)
 Pole Vault winners:  Sedat Cacim (m) /  Ula Bohorč (f)
 Shot Put winners:  Muhamet Ramadani (m) /  Akyol Pınar (f)
  winners:  (m) /  (f)
 20 February: 2021 Balkan Athletics Indoor Championships in  Istanbul
 60 m winners:  Kayhan Özer (m) /  Inna Eftimova (f)
 400 m winners:  İlyas Çanakçı (m) /  Andrea Miklós (f)
 800 m winners:  Oleh Myronets (m) /  Svitlana Zhulzhyk (f)
 1500 m winners:  Mitko Tsenov (m) /  Maruša Mišmaš (f)
 3000 m winners:  Dario Ivanovski (m) /  Klara Lukan (f)
 60 m Hurdles winners:  Mikdat Sevler (m) /  Anamaria Nesteriuc (f)
 Long Jump winners:  Izmir Smajlaj (m) /  Ivana Španović (f)
 Triple Jump winners:  Nazim Babayev (m) /  Tuğba Danışmaz (f)
 High Jump winners:  Tihomir Ivanov (m) /  Marija Vuković (f)
 Pole Vault winners:  Ersu Şaşma (m) /  Iana Gladiichuk (f)
 Shot Put winners:  Armin Sinančević (m) /  Emel Dereli (f)
  winners:  (Akın Özyürek, Ismail Nezir, Ali Aksu, Oğuzhan Kaya) (m) /  (Alina Lohvynenko, Viktoriya Tkachuk, Anastasiia Bryzgina, Anna Ryzhykova) (f)
 4 – 7 March: 2021 European Athletics Indoor Championships in  Toruń

2021 European Athletics Outdoor Area Permit Meetings
 24 May: 36eme Meeting International Athletisme Montgeron-Essonne in  Montgeron (APM No. 1)

2020–2021 Oceania Area Permit Meetings
 18 December 2020: Night of 5's in  Auckland (APM No. 1)
 100 m winners:  Edward Osei-Nketia (m) /  Zoe Hobbs (f)
 800 m winners:  James Harding (m) /  Joanna Poland (f)
 5000 m winners:  Eric Speakman (m) /  Lydia O'Donnell (f)
 400 m Hurdles winners:  Cameron French (m) /  Anna Percy (f)
 High Jump winners:  Hamish Kerr (m) /  Josie Taylor (f)
 Pole Vault winners:  Max Attwell (m) /  Olivia McTaggart (f)
 Shot Put winners:  Jacko Gill (m) /  Maddi Wesche (f)
 Discus Throw winners:  Alexander Parkinson (m) /  Savannah Scheen (f)
 Hammer Throw winners:  Anthony Nobilo (m) /  Julia Ratcliffe (f)
 23 January: Potts Classic in  Hastings (APM No. 2)
 100 m winners:  Tiaan Whelpton (m) /  Zoe Hobbs (f)
 800 m winners:  James Preston (m) /  Rebekah Greene (f)
 3000m Steeplechase winners:  Samuel Tanner (m) /  Kara MacDermid (f)
 Long Jump winners:  Angus Lyver (m) /  Mariah Ririnui (f)
 Pole Vault winners:  James Steyn (m) /  Olivia McTaggart (f)
 Shot Put winners:  Tom Walsh (m) /  Valerie Adams (f)
 Discus Throw winners:  Connor Bell (m) /  Savannah Scheen (f)
 Hammer Throw winners:  Anthony Nobilo (m) /  Lauren Bruce (f)
 26 January: Zatopek Classic in  Melbourne (APM No. 3)
 800 m winners:  Jeffrey Riseley (m) /  Catriona Bisset (f)
 1500 m winners:  Jordan Williamsz (m) /  Linden Hall
 3000 m winners:  Adam Spencer (m) /  Abbey Caldwell (f)
 10000 m winners:  Brett Robinson (m) /  Rose Davies (f)
 400 m Hurdles winners:  Conor Fry (m) /  Sara Klein (f)
 Pole Vault winners:  James Woods (m) /  Cassidy Bradshaw (f)
 Long Jump winners:  Darcy Roper (m) /  Mia Scerri (f)
 30 January: Cooks Classic in  Whanganui (APM No. 4)
 200 m winners:  Edward Osei-Nketia (m) /  Natasha Eady (f)
 400 m winners:  James Robertson (m) /  Camryn Smart (f)
 1 Mile Run winners:  Samuel Tanner (m) /  Camille Buscomb (f)
 400 m Hurdles winners:  Cameron French (m) /  Portia Bing (f)
 High Jump winners:  Hamish Kerr (m) /  Josie Taylor (f)
 Triple Jump winners:  Scott Thomson (m) /  Anna Thomsom (f)
 Shot Put winners:  Jacko Gill (m) /  Lisa Adams (f)
 Women's Hammer Throw winner:  Lauren Bruce
 Javelin Throw winners:  Ben Langton Burnell (m) /  Tori Peeters (f)
 13 February: Porritt Classic in  Hamilton (APM No. 5)
 200 m winners:  Edward Osei-Nketia (m) /  Georgia Hulls (f)
 Men's 800 m winner:  James Preston
 Women's 1500 m winner:  Camille Buscomb
 Men's 5000 m winner:  Hayden Wilde
 Men's 110 m Hurdles winner:  Joshua Hawkins
 Women's 100 m Hurdles winner:  Amy Robertson
 400 m Hurdles winners:  Cameron French (m) /  Portia Bing (f)
 Men's Long Jump winner:  Shay Veitch
 Women's Triple Jump winner:  Anna Thomson
 Shot Put winners:  Jacko Gill (m) /  Valerie Adams (f)
 Women's Hammer Throw winner:  Lauren Bruce
 Javelin Throw winners:  Ben Langton Burnell (m) /  Tori Peeters (f)
 20 February: Capital Classic in  Wellington (APM No. 6)
 100 m winners:  Edward Osei-Nketia (m) /  Natasha Eady (f)
 400 m winners:  Hamish Gill (m) /  Camryn Smart (f)
 Women's 800 m winner:  Katherine Camp
 Men's 1500 m winner:  Julian Oakley
 Men's 110 m Hurdles winner:  James Sandilands
 Women's 100 m Hurdles winner:  Amy Robertson
 Women's Long Jump winner:  Lili Szabó (f)
 Men's Triple Jump winner:  Andrew Allan
 High Jump winners:  Hamish Kerr (m) /  Keeley O'Hagan (f)
 Pole Vault winners:  Ettiene du Preez (m) /  Olivia McTaggart (f)
 Discus Throw winners:  Connor Bell (m) /  Savannah Scheen (f)
 Hammer Throw winners:  Antony Nobilo (m) /  Lauren Bruce (f)
 25 February: Summer Super Series in  Canberra (APM No. 7)
 100 m winners:  Jack Hale (m) /  Hana Basic (f)
 Men's 200 m winner:  Alex Hartmann
 800 m winners:  Peter Bol (m) /  Catriona Bisset (f)
 Men's 110 m Hurdles winner:  Nicholas Hough
 Women's 100 m Hurdles winner:  Hannah Jones
 3000 m Steeplechase winners:  Ben Buckingham (m) /  Cara Feain-Ryan (f)
 Long Jump winners:  Chris Mitrevski (m) /  Annie McGuire (f)
 Triple Jump winners:  Ayo Ore (m) /  Chloe Grenade (f)
 High Jump winners:  Brandon Starc (m) /  Nicola McDermott (f)
 Men's Shot Put winner:  Damien Birkinhead
 Hammer Throw winners:  Costa Kousparis (m) /  Alexandra Hulley (f)
 Women's Javelin Throw winner:  Mackenzie Little

Badminton
 16 – 20 February: 2021 European Mixed Team Badminton Championships in  Vantaa
 In the final,  defeated , 3–0, to win their eightteeth European Mixed Team Badminton Championships.
 26 – 29 April: 2021 All Africa Mixed Team Championships in  TBD
 27 April – 2 May: 2021 Badminton Asia Championships in  TBD
 27 April – 2 May: 2021 European Badminton Championships in  Kyiv
 27 April – 2 May: 2021 Pan Am Badminton Championships in  Guatemala City
 30 April – 2 May: 2021 African Badminton Championships in  TBD
 12 – 19 December: 2021 BWF World Championships in   Huelva
 2021 BWF Para-Badminton World Championships in Japan
 2021 BWF World Junior Championships in Chengdu, China

2021 BWF World Tour
Super 1000
 17 – 21 March: 2021 All England Open in  Birmingham

Super 750
 31 March – 4 April: 2021 Malaysia Open in  Kuala Lumpur

Super 500
 6 – 11 April: 2021 Malaysia Masters in  Kuala Lumpur
 13 – 18 April: 2021 Singapore Open in 

Super 300
 2 – 7 March: 2021 Swiss Open in  Basel
 Men's Singles:  Viktor Axelsen defeated  Kunlavut Vitidsarn, 21–16, 21–6.
 Women's Singles:  Carolina Marín defeated  P. V. Sindhu, 21–12, 21–5.
 Men's Doubles:  Kim Astrup &  Anders Skaarup Rasmussen defeated  Mark Lamsfuß &  Marvin Emil Seidel, 21–16, 21–11.
 Women's Doubles:  Pearly Tan Koong Le &  Thinaah Muralitharan defeated  Gabriela Stoeva &  Stefani Stoeva, 21–19, 21–12.
 Mixed Doubles:  Thom Gicquel &  Delphine Delrue defeated  Mathias Christiansen &  Alexandra Bøje, 21–19, 21–19

Super 100
 23 – 28 March: 2021 Orléans Masters in

2021 BWF Continental Circuit
Africa
 25 – 28 February: Uganda International in  Kampala
 Men's Singles:  Varun Kapur defeated  S. Sankar Muthusamy Subramanian, 21–18, 16–21, 21–17.
 Women's Singles:  Malvika Bansod defeated  Anupama Upadhyaya, 17–21, 25–23, 21–10.
 Men's Doubles: No competition
 Women's Doubles:  Husina Kobugabe &  Mable Namakoye defeated  Fadilah Mohamed Rafi &  Tracy Naluwooza, 21–9, 21–17.
 Mixed Doubles:  Israel Wanagalya &  Betty Apio defeated  Brian Kasirye &  Husina Kobugabe, 21–13, 22–20.

Bandy
2021 Bandy World Championship
2021 Bandy World Cup
Bandy World Championship U-21 2021
Bandy World Championship U-19 2021
Bandy World Championship U-17 2021
Bandy World Championship U-15 2021
Bandy World Championships for Girls U-17 2021

Baseball

2021 U-23 Baseball World Cup
2021 World Junior Baseball Championship
2021 World Youth Baseball Championship
2021 World 12U Baseball Championship

Major League Baseball
1 April – 3 October: 2021 Major League Baseball season
11–13 July: 2021 Major League Baseball draft
13 July: 2021 Major League Baseball All-Star Game at Coors Field in  Denver
26 October: 2021 World Series

2021 Little League Baseball World Series
19 – 29 August: Little League World Series in  South Williamsport at both the Little League Volunteer Stadium and Howard J. Lamade Stadium

2021 Intermediate League Baseball World Series

2021 Junior League Baseball World Series

2021 Senior League Baseball World Series

Basketball

National Basketball Association
22 December – 16 May: 2020-21 NBA season
7 March: 2021 NBA All-Star Game at State Farm Arena in  Atlanta, Georgia
 All-Star Game: Team LeBron defeated Team Durant, 170 – 150.
 Skills Challenge: Domantas Sabonis  defeated Nikola Vučević 
 Three Point Contest: Stephen Curry 
 Slam Dunk Contest: Anfernee Simons 
22 May – 21 July: 2021 NBA playoffs  Milwaukee Bucks defeated  Phoenix Suns 4–2 in the 2021 NBA Finals.
29 July: 2021 NBA draft

National Collegiate Athletic Association
16 March – 5 April: 2021 NCAA Division I men's basketball tournament
19 March – 4 April: 2021 NCAA Division I women's basketball tournament

FIBA
17–29 August: 2021 FIBA Asia Cup
17–29 August: AfroBasket 2021 in  Rwanda
6 February: 2021 FIBA Intercontinental Cup
3–11 July: 2021 FIBA Under-19 Basketball World Cup
7–15 August: 2021 FIBA Under-19 Women's Basketball World Cup

FIBA Europe
National teams

Club teams
 15 September 2020 – 9 May: 2020–21 Basketball Champions League
 29 September 2020 – 14 April: 2020–21 EuroCup Basketball
 1 October 2020 – 9 April: 2020–21 EuroLeague (Regular season)
 28 October 2020 – 18 April: 2020–21 EuroLeague Women
 9 December 2020 – 11 April: 2020–21 EuroCup Women
 In the final,  Valencia Basket defeated  Reyer Venezia, 82–81, to win their 1st Women EuroCup.
  Atomerőmű KSC Szekszárd took third place.
 6 January – TBD 2020–21 FIBA Europe Cup

Regional competitions
 2 October 2020 – 16 April: 2020–21 ABA League First Division (Regular season)
 3 October 2020 – 11 April: 2020–21 Latvian–Estonian Basketball League
 In the final,  BC Kalev/Cramo defeated  VEF Rīga, 86–75, to win their 1st Latvian–Estonian Basketball League.
  BK Ogre took third place.
 13 October 2020 – April: 2020–21 BIBL season
 14 October 2020 – 3 March: 2020–21 WABA League (Regular season)
 20–21 March: WABA League (Final Four)
 9 November 2020 – TBD: 2020–21 ABA League Second Division
 TBD: 2020–21 Alpe Adria Cup
 6 – 14 April: 2020–21 Liga Unike

FIBA Americas
National teams
 24 – 28 March: 2021 Centrobasket Women in 
 Round Robin Final Placements: 1st. , 2nd. , 3rd. , 4th. , 5th. 

Club teams
 31 January – 14 April: 2020–21 BCLA season

FIBA 3X3
 10 – 12 September: 2021 FIBA 3x3 Europe Cup in  Paris
 12–14 November: 2021 FIBA 3x3 AmeriCup in  Miami, Florida

Beach handball

2021 IHF Youth Beach Handball World Championship (Postponed to 2022)

Beach soccer
 2021 FIFA Beach Soccer World Cup (Russia)

Beach tennis

2021 ITF Beach Tennis World Tour
B10
 15 January: BTWT #1 in  Dubai
 Men's:  Vladimir Helmut &  Javier Méndez defeated  Tiaan Bredenkamp &  Emilio Misas, 6–1, 6–0.
 Women's:  Marta Apraiz &  Safaa Bahman defeated  Jessica Palma &  Rebeka Zálešáková, 6–3, 6–3.
 16 January: BTWT #2 in  Clearwater #1
 Men's:  Diego Guzmán &  Aksel Samardzic defeated  Luis Miguel Reyes Peñalverty &  Carlos Rivera, 6–3, 1–6, [12–10].
 Women's:  Angela Bemquerer &  Larissa Boechat defeated  Mayra Kaefer &  Emilie Katz, 4–6, 7–6(7–5), [10–8].
 17 January: BTWT #3 in  Clearwater #2
 Men's:  Diego Guzmán &  Aksel Samardzic defeated  Luis Miguel Reyes Peñalverty &  Carlos Rivera, 6–1, 6–3.
 Women's:  Mayra Kaefer &  Emilie Katz defeated  Mariandreina Morales &  Sherilyn Villalobos, 6–1, 6–3.
 15 & 16 February: BTWT #4 in  Las Palmas
 Men's:  Javier González Rosales &  Santi Puente defeated  Alvaro García González &  Carlos Rodríguez Perera, 7–6(7–3), 7–5.
 Women's:  Inés León Ojeda &  Daniela Rodríguez Perera defeated  Nicole Borzęcka &  Alina Robok, 6–3, 7–6(7–1).
 13 March: BTWT #5 in  Ponta Delgada
 20 March: BTWT #6 in  Angra do Heroísmo

B50
 22 & 23 January: BTWT #1 in  Dubai
 Men's:  Nikita Burmakin &  Paolo Tronci defeated  Vladimir Helmut &  Javier Méndez, 6–1, 6–2. 
 Women's:  Marta Apraiz &  Katarína Páleníková defeated  Ekaterina Kamenetckaia &  Elena Koval, 6–2, 6–4.
 12 – 14 February: BTWT #2 in  Las Palmas
 Men's:  Victor López Rubio &  Saulo Tejada Dámaso defeated  Joeri Ertner &  Bo Groot Antink, 6–4, 6–3. 
 Women's:  Ariadna Costa Graell &  Eva Fernández Palos defeated  Carolina Miranda Naranjo &  Anely Ruiz Campos, 6–2, 6–3.

Beach volleyball

2021 FIVB Beach Volleyball U21 World Championships
2021 FIVB Beach Volleyball U19 World Championships

2021 FIVB Beach Volleyball World Tour

1 Star
 26 – 28 February: #1 Competition in  Doha (Men's only)
 Winners:  Cherif Younousse &  Ahmed Tijan

4 Stars
 8 – 13 March: #1 Competition in  Doha

Biathlon

 24 – 31 January: Biathlon European Championships 2021 in  Duszniki-Zdrój
 Men's 20 km Individual winner:  Andrejs Rastorgujevs
 Women's 15 km Individual winner:  Monika Hojnisz
 Men's 10 km Sprint winner:  Martin Jäger
 Women's 7.5 Sprint winner:  Baiba Bendika
 Men's 12.5 km Pursuit winner:  Artem Pryma
 Women's 10 km Pursuit winner:  Kamila Żuk
 Single Mixed Relay winners:  (Stefanie Scherer & Justus Strelow)
 4x6 km Mixed Relay winners:  (Emilie Ågheim Kalkenberg, Åsne Skrede, Erlend Bjøntegaard, Sivert Guttorm Bakken)
 9 – 21 February: Biathlon World Championships 2021 in  Pokljuka
 Men's 10 km sprint winner:  Martin Ponsiluoma
 Women's 7.5 km sprint winner:  Tiril Eckhoff
 Men's 12.5 km pursuit winner:  Émilien Jacquelin
 Women's 10 km pursuit winner:  Tiril Eckhoff
 Men's 20 km individual winner:  Sturla Holm Lægreid
 Women's 15 km individual winner:  Markéta Davidová
 Men's 15 km mass start winner:  Sturla Holm Lægreid
 Women's 12.5 km mass start winner:  Lisa Theresa Hauser
 Men's 4 × 7.5 km relay winners:  (Sturla Holm Lægreid, Tarjei Bø, Johannes Thingnes Bø, Vetle Sjåstad Christiansen)
 Women's 4 × 6 km relay winners:  (Ingrid Landmark Tandrevold, Tiril Eckhoff, Ida Lien, Marte Olsbu Røiseland)
 Mixed 4 × 7.5 km M+W relay winners:  (Sturla Holm Lægreid, Johannes Thingnes Bø, Tiril Eckhoff, Marte Olsbu Røiseland)
 Mixed 6 km M + 7.5 km W single relay winners:  (Antonin Guigonnat & Julia Simon)
 24 February – 7 March: Biathlon Junior World Championships 2021 in  Obertilliach
 2021 Summer Biathlon World Championships in Nove Mesto na Morave, Czech Republic

2020–21 Biathlon World Cup
 27 – 29 November 2020: WC #1 in  Kontiolahti #1
 Men's 20 km Individual winner:  Sturla Holm Lægreid
 Women's 15 km Individual winner:  Dorothea Wierer
 Men's 10 km Sprint winner:  Johannes Thingnes Bø
 Women's 7.5 Sprint winner:  Hanna Öberg
 30 November – 6 December 2020: WC #2 in  Kontiolahti #2
 Men's 10 km Sprint winner:  Tarjei Bø
 Women's 7.5 Sprint winner:  Hanna Öberg
 Men's 12.5 km Pursuit winner:  Sebastian Samuelsson
 Women's 10 km Pursuit winner:  Tiril Eckhoff
 Men's 4x7.5 km Relay winners:  (Sturla Holm Lægreid, Vetle Sjåstad Christiansen, Tarjei Bø, Johannes Thingnes Bø)
 Women's 4x6 km Relay winners:  (Johanna Skottheim, Mona Brorsson, Elvira Öberg, Hanna Öberg)
 11 – 13 December 2020: WC #3 in  Hochfilzen #1
 Men's 10 km Sprint winner:  Johannes Dale
 Women's 7.5 Sprint winner:  Dzinara Alimbekava
 Men's 12.5 km Pursuit winner:  Quentin Fillon Maillet
 Women's 10 km Pursuit winner:  Marte Olsbu Røiseland
 17 – 20 December 2020: WC #4 in  Hochfilzen #2
 Men's 10 km Sprint winner:  Sturla Holm Lægreid
 Women's 7.5 Sprint winner:  Tiril Eckhoff
 Men's 12.5 km Pursuit winner:  Sturla Holm Lægreid
 Women's 10 km Pursuit winner:  Tiril Eckhoff
 Men's 15 km Mass Start winner:  Arnd Peiffer
 Women's 12.5 km Mass Start winner:  Marte Olsbu Røiseland
 4 – 10 January: WC #5 in  Oberhof #1
 Men's 10 km Sprint winner:  Johannes Thingnes Bø
 Women's 7.5 km Sprint winner:  Tiril Eckhoff
 Men's 12.5 km Pursuit winner:  Sturla Holm Lægreid
 Women's 10 km Pursuit winner:  Tiril Eckhoff
 Single Mixed Relay winners:  (Julia Simon & Émilien Jacquelin)
 4x6 km Mixed Relay winners:  (Uliana Kaisheva, Svetlana Mironova, Alexander Loginov, Eduard Latypov)
 11 – 17 January: WC #5 in  Oberhof #2
 Men's 10 km Sprint winner:  Johannes Thingnes Bø
 Women's 7.5 km Sprint winner:  Tiril Eckhoff
 Men's 15 km Mass Start winner:  Tarjei Bø
 Women's 12.5 km Mass Start winner:  Julia Simon
 Men's 4x7.5 km Relay winners:  Simon Desthieux, Quentin Fillon Maillet, Fabien Claude, Émilien Jacquelin)
 Women's 4x6 km Relay winners:  (Vanessa Hinz, Janina Hettich, Denise Herrmann, Franziska Preuß)
 18 – 24 January: WC #6 in  Antholz-Anterselva
 Men's 20 km Individual winner:  Alexander Loginov
 Women's 15 km Individual winner:  Lisa Hauser
 Men's 15 km Mass Start winner:  Johannes Thingnes Bø
 Women's 12.5 km Mass Start winner:  Julia Simon
 Men's 4x7.5 km Relay winners:  Simon Desthieux, Quentin Fillon Maillet, Antonin Guigonnat, Émilien Jacquelin)
 Women's 4x6 km Relay winners:  (Evgeniya Pavlova, Tatiana Akimova, Svetlana Mironova, Uliana Kaisheva)

2020–21 IBU Cup
 11 – 17 January: IBU Cup #1 in  Arber #1
 Men's 10 km Sprint winners:  Aleksander Fjeld Andersen (No. 1) /  Filip Fjeld Andersen (No. 2)
 Women's 7.5 km Sprint winners:  Tatiana Akimova (2 times)
 Men's 4x7.5 km Relay winners:  (Justus Strelow, Dominic Schmuck, Danilo Riethmüller, Philipp Nawrath)
 Women's 4x6 km Relay winners:  (Valeriia Vasnetcova, Anastasiia Goreeva, Anastasia Shevchenko, Tatiana Akimova)
 18 – 23 January: IBU Cup #2 in  Arber #2
 Men's 15 km Short Individual winner:  Endre Strømsheim
 Women's 12.5 km Short Individual winner:  Tamara Steiner
 Men's 10 km Sprint winner:  Filip Fjeld Andersen
 Women's 7.5 km Sprint winner:  Valeriia Vasnetcova
 Single Mixed Relay winners:  (Endre Strømsheim & Karoline Erdal)
 4x7.5 km Mixed Relay winners:  (Said Karimulla Khalili, Daniil Serokhvostov, Anastasiia Goreeva, Valeriia Vasnetcova)

Bobsleigh & Skeleton

 8 – 10 January: IBSF European Championships 2021 in  Winterberg
 Two-man winners:  (Francesco Friedrich & Thorsten Margis)
 Four-man winners:  (Francesco Friedrich, Thorsten Margis, Candy Bauer, Alexander Schüller)
 Two-woman winners:  (Laura Nolte & Deborah Levi)
 Skeleton winners:  Aleksandr Tretyakov (m) /  Elena Nikitina (f)
 22 – 24 January: IBSF Junior World Championships 2021 in  St. Moritz
 U23 Two-man winners:  (Mihai Cristian Tentea & Nicolae Ciprian Daroczi)
 U23 Two-woman winners:  (Margot Boch & Madison Stringer)
 Junior Two-man winners:  (Hans Peter Hannighofer & Christian Röder)
 Junior Two-woman winners:  (Laura Nolte & Deborah Levi)
 U23 Four-man winners:  (Vyacheslav Popov, Dmitrii Abramov, Andrey Andriyanov, Egor Gryaznov)
 Junior Four-man winners:  (Michael Vogt, Silvio Weber, Sandro Michel, Andreas Haas)
 U20 Skeleton winners:  Lukas Nydegger (m) /  Anastasiia Tsyganova (f)
 Junior Skeleton winners:  Evgeniy Rukosuev (m) /  Hannah Neise (f)
 5 – 14 February: IBSF World Championships 2021 in  Lake Placid
 Two-man winners:  (Francesco Friedrich & Alexander Schüller)
 Four-man winners:  (Francesco Friedrich, Thorsten Margis, Candy Bauer, Alexander Schüller)
 Women's Monobob winner:  Kaillie Humphries
 Two-woman winners:  (Kaillie Humphries & Lolo Jones)
 Skeleton winners:  Christopher Grotheer (m) /  Tina Hermann (f)
 Skeleton mixed team winners:  (Tina Hermann & Christopher Grotheer)
 2021 IBSF Para Sport World Championship
 2021 World Junior Bobsleigh Championships
 2021 World Junior Skeleton Championships

2020–21 Bobsleigh World Cup
 20 & 21 November 2020: World Cup #1 in  Sigulda #1
 Two-man winners:  (Francesco Friedrich & Thorsten Margis) (No. 1) /  (Francesco Friedrich & Alexander Schüller) (No. 2)
 Two-woman winners:  (Mariama Jamanka & Vanessa Mark)
 28 & 29 November 2020: World Cup #2 in  Sigulda #2
 Two-man winners:  (Francesco Friedrich & Thorsten Margis) (No. 1) /  (Francesco Friedrich & Alexander Schüller) (No. 2)
 Two-woman winners:  (Laura Nolte & Leonie Fiebig)
 12 & 13 December 2020: World Cup #3 in  Innsbruck #1
 Two-man winners:  (Johannes Lochner & Eric Franke) (No. 1) /  (Francesco Friedrich & Thorsten Margis) (No. 2)
 19 & 20 December 2020: World Cup #4 in  Innsbruck #2
 Two-man winners:  (Francesco Friedrich & Thorsten Margis) (2 times)
 Two-women winners:  (Stephanie Schneider & Leonie Fiebig)
 8 – 10 January: World Cup #5 in  Winterberg
 Two-man winners:  (Francesco Friedrich & Thorsten Margis)
 Four-man winners:  (Francesco Friedrich, Thorsten Margis, Candy Bauer, Alexander Schüller)
 Two-woman winners:  (Laura Nolte & Deborah Levi)
 16 & 17 January: World Cup #6 in  St. Moritz
 Two-man winners:  (Francesco Friedrich & Alexander Schüller)
 Four-man winners:  (Francesco Friedrich, Thorsten Margis, Martin Grothkopp, Alexander Schüller)
 Two-women winners:  (Stephanie Schneider & Leonie Fiebig)
 23 & 24 January: World Cup #7 in  Königssee
 Two-man winners:  (Francesco Friedrich & Thorsten Margis)
 Four-man winners:  (Francesco Friedrich, Thorsten Margis, Martin Grothkopp, Alexander Schüller)
 Two-women winners:  (Kim Kalicki & Ann-Christin Strack)
 30 & 31 January: World Cup #8 in  Innsbruck #3 (final)
 Two-man winners:  (Francesco Friedrich & Alexander Schüller)
 Four-man winners:  (Francesco Friedrich, Thorsten Margis, Candy Bauer, Alexander Schüller)
 Two-women winners:  (Kaillie Humphries & Lolo Jones)

2020–21 Skeleton World Cup
 20 November 2020: World Cup #1 in  Sigulda #1
 Winners:  Martins Dukurs (m) /  Janine Flock (f)
 27 November 2020 World Cup #2 in  Sigulda #2
 Winners:  Martins Dukurs (m) /  Janine Flock (f)
 11 December 2020: World Cup #3 in  Innsbruck #1
 Winners:  Martins Dukurs &  Aleksandr Tretyakov (m) /  Elena Nikitina (f)
 18 December 2020: World Cup #4 in  Innsbruck #2
 Winners:  Martins Dukurs (m) /  Janine Flock (f)
 8 January: World Cup #5 in  Winterberg
 Winners:  Aleksandr Tretyakov (m) /  Elena Nikitina (f)
 15 January: World Cup #6 in  St. Moritz
 Winners:  Alexander Gassner (m) /  Tina Hermann (f)
 22 January: World Cup #7 in  Königssee
 Winners:  Alexander Gassner (m) /  Jacqueline Lölling (f)
 29 January: World Cup #8 in  Innsbruck #3 (final)
 Winners:  Alexander Tretyakov (m) /  Elena Nikitina (f)

2020–21 Bobsleigh Europe Cup
 5 & 6 December 2020: EC #1 in  Winterberg
 Two-man winners:  (Hans Peter Hannighofer & Christian Roeder) (2 times)
 Two-women winners:  (Stephanie Schneider & Tamara Seer)
 19 & 20 December 2020: EC #2 in  Sigulda
 Two-man winners:  (Dāvis Kaufmanis & Krists Lindenblats) (No. 1) /  (Maksim Andrianov & Maxim Belugin) (No. 2)
 Two-women winners:  (Alena Osipenko & Aleksandra Tarasova) (2 times)
 7 – 9 January: EC #3 in  Altenberg
 Two-man winners:  (Hans Peter Hannighofer & Christian Roeder) (2 times)
 Two-women winners:  (Stephanie Schneider & Claudia Schüßler)
 Four-man winners:  (Christopher Spring, Mark Mlakar, Shaquille Murray-Lawrence, Mike Evelyn)
 13 – 15 January: EC #4 in  Innsbruck
 Two-man winners:  (Michael Kuonen & Marco Tanner)
 Two-women winners:  (Lisa Buckwitz & Cynthia Kwofie)
 Four-man winners:  (Philipp Zielasko, Joshua Kossmann, Benedikt Hertel, Erec Maximilian Bruckert) (2 times)
 20 & 21 February: EC #5 in  Königssee (final)
 Two-man winners:  (Mihai Cristian Tentea & Nicolae Ciprian Daroczi)
 Two-women winners:
 Four-man winners:

2021 Bobsleigh North American Cup
 15 – 17 January: NAC #1 in  Park City #1
 Two-man winners:  (Sam Moeller & Joshua Williamson) (No. 1) /  (Frank Delduca & Hakeem Abdul-Saboor) (No. 2) /  (Sam Moeller & Hakeem Abdul-Saboor)
 21 – 23 January: NAC #2 in  Park City #2
 Two-women winners:  (Nicole Vogt & Kaysha Love) (No. 1) /  (Nicole Vogt & Kelsey Kiel) (No. 2) /  (Nicole Vogt & Colleen Fotsch) (No. 3)
 Four-man winners:  (Hunter Church, Charles Volker, Joshua Williamson, Hakeem Abdul-Saboor) (3 times)
 1 – 4 February: NAC #3 in  Lake Placid
 Two-man winners:  (Hunter Church & Hakeem Abdul-Saboor) (No. 1) /  (Hunter Church & Joshua Williamson)
 Two-women winners:
 Four-man winners:  (Hunter Church, Charles Volker, Joshua Williamson, Hakeem Abdul-Saboor) (2 times)

2020–21 Skeleton Europe Cup
 27 & 28 November 2020: EC #1 in  Winterberg
 Men's winners:  Felix Seibel (No. 1) /  Kilian von Schleinitz (No. 2)
 Women's winners:  Sarah Wimmer (2 times)
 19 December 2020: EC #2 in  Sigulda
 Winners:  Krists Netlaus (m) /  Stefanie Votz (f)
 13 January: EC #3 in  Altenberg
 Winners:  Matt Weston (m) /  Corinna Leipold (f)
 6 February: EC #4 in  Königssee
 Winners:  Cedric Renner (m) /  Stefanie Votz (f)
 19 February: EC #5 in  Innsbruck (final)
 Winners:  Evgeniy Rukosuev (m) /  Alina Tararychenkova (f)

2021 Skeleton Intercontinental Cup
 16 January: IC #1 in  Altenberg
 Winners:  Axel Jungk (m) /  Elena Nikitina (f)

2021 Skeleton North American Cup
 26 – 28 January: NAC #1 in  Park City #1
 Men's winners:  John Daly (3 times)
 Women's winners:  Megan Henry (3 times)
 4 & 5 February: NAC #2 in  Lake Placid (final)
 Men's winners:  John Daly (2 times)
 Women's winners:  Savannah Graybill (No. 1) /  Mystique Ro (No. 2)

2020–21 Women's Monobob World Series
 5 December 2020: World Series #1 in  Winterberg
 Women's Monobob winner:  Nadezhda Sergeeva
 12 December 2020: World Series #2 in  Innsbruck
 Women's Monobob winner:  Breeana Walker
 14 January: World Series #3 in  Innsbruck
 Women's Monobob winner:  Melissa Lotholz
 15 – 17 January: World Series #4 in  Park City
 Women's Monobob winners:  Nicole Vogt (2 times) /  Carrie Russell (No. 3)
 16 January: World Series #5 in  St. Moritz
 Women's Monobob winner:  Kaillie Humphries
 23 January: World Series #6 in  Königssee
 Women's Monobob winner:  Kaillie Humphries
 30 January: World Series #7 in  Innsbruck
 Women's Monobob winner:  Breeana Walker
 1 & 2 February: World Series #8 in  Lake Placid
 Women's Monobob winners:  Nicole Vogt (2 times)
 13 & 14 February: World Series #9 in  Altenberg
 Women's Monobob winner:  Kaillie Humphries
 20 February: World Series #10 in  Königssee
 Women's Monobob winners:  Martina Fontanive /  Melanie Hasler

Boccia

Bowling
 24 January – 21 February: 27th PBA Players Championship in Jupiter, FL (winner: Kyle Troup)
 28 February: 56th PBA Tournament of Champions in Jupiter, FL (winner: Francois Lavoie)
 13 March: 61st PBA Guaranteed Rate World Championship in Tampa, FL (winner: Tom Daugherty)
 13 March: WSOB XII PBA Roth/Holman Doubles Championship (winners: Andrew Anderson/Kris Prather)
 6–15 November: 2021 WTBA World Tenpin Bowling Championships

Bowls
 7 – 19 September: 2021 World Bowls Championship in  Gold Coast , cancelled
 8 – 24 January: 2021 World Indoor Bowls Championship in  Norfolk

Boxing
 10 – 24 April: 2021 AIBA Youth World Boxing Championships in  Kielce
 21 – 31 May: 2021 Asian Amateur Boxing Championships in  New Delhi
 26 October – 6 November: 2021 AIBA World Boxing Championships in  Belgrade
 October: 2021 AIBA Women's World Boxing Championships in TBD

EUBC

Elite Tournaments
 11 – 16 January: Women's Boxing EUBC European Nations Cup 2021 in  Sombor (Women's Elite Only)

 Women's Light Fly winner:  Arailym Marat
 Women's Fly winner:  Nina Radovanovic
 Women's Bantam winner:  Dina Zholaman
 Women's Light Welter winner:  Natalia Sychugova

 Women's Welter winner:  Busenaz Sürmeneli
 Women's Light Heavy winner:  Milena Matović
 Women's Heavy winner:  Lazzat Kungeibayeva

 7 – 13 February: 65th Bocskai István Memorial International Boxing Tournament in  Debrecen
Women's

 Women's Fly winner:  Buse Naz Çakıroğlu
 Women's Feather winner:  Irma Testa
 Women's Light winner:  Mira Potkonen

 Women's Light Middle winner:  Busenaz Sürmeneli
 Women's Middle winner:  Nouchka Fontijn

Men's

 Men's Fly winner:  Gabriel Escobar
 Men's Light winner:  Richárd Kovács
 Men's Middle winner:  Lewis Richardson
 Men's Heavy winner:  Emmanuel Reyes Pla

 Men's Bantam winner:  Samuel Kistohurry
 Men's Welter winner:  Lambert Harvey
 Men's Light Heavy winner:  Simone Fiori
 Men's Super Heavy winner:  Frazer Clarke

 21 – 28 February: 72nd International Boxing Tournament STRANDJA 2021 in  Sofia
Women's

 Women's Fly winner:  Stoyka Krasteva
 Women's Light winner:  Stanimira Petrova
 Women's Welter winner:  Valentina Khalzova

 Women's Light Welter winner:  Beatriz Ferreira
 Women's Middle winner:  Naomi Graham

Men's

 Men's Fly winner:  Daniel Asenov
 Men's Light winner:  Ilya Popov
 Men's Middle winner:  Oleksandr Khyzhniak
 Men's Heavy winner:  Radoslav Pantaleev

 Men's Feather winner:  Havier Ibanes
 Men's Welter winner:  Bobo-Usmon Baturov
 Men's Light Heavy winner:  Dilshodbek Ruzmetov
 Men's Super Heavy winner:  Bakhodir Jalolov

 1 – 7 March: International Boxing Tournament "Boxam" in  Castellón de la Plana
Women

 Women's Light Flyweight winner:  Roberta Bonatti
 Women's Featherweight winner:  Irma Testa
 Women's Welterweight winner:  Angela Carini
 Women's Heavyweight winner:  Flavia Severin

 Women's Flyweight winner:  Svetlana Soluianova
 Women's Lightweight winner:  Rashida Ellis
 Women's Middleweight winner:  Naomi Graham

Men's

 Men's Flyweight winner:  Makhmud Sabyrkhan
 Men's Light Welterweight winner:  Manish Kaushik
 Men's Middleweight winner:  Miguel Cuadrado
 Men's Heavyweight winner:  Emmanuel Reyes

 Men's Featherweight winner:  Jean Rivera
 Men's Welterweight winner:  Youba Sissokho
 Men's Light Heavyweight winner:  Simone Fiori
 Men's Super Heavyweight winner:  Ayoub Ghadfa Drissi

 10 – 14 March: Cologne Boxing World Cup in  Köln
Women

 Women's Featherweight winner:  Jucielen Romeu
 Women's Welterweight winner:  Leonie Müller
 Women's Flyweight winner:  Maxi Klötzer

 Women's Lightweight winner:  Beatriz Ferreira
 Women's Middleweight winner:  Nouchka Fontijn

Men's

 Men's 52 kg winner:  Billal Bennama
 Men's 57 kg winner:  Samuel Kistohurry
 Men's 63 kg winner:  Wanderson Oliveira
 Men's 91 kg winner:  Aibek Oralbay

 Men's 69 kg winner:  Magomed Schachidov
 Men's 75 kg winner:  Kevin Schumann
 Men's 81 kg winner:  Keno Machado
 Men's +91 kg winner:  Kamshybek Kunkabayev

 15 – 21 March: International Elite Men & Women Istanbul Bosphorus Boxing Tournament in  Istanbul
Women

 Women's Flyweight winner:  Buse Naz Çakıroğlu
 Women's Battam winner:  Daria Abramovai
 Women's Welterweight winner:  Darima Sandakova

 Women's Lightweight winner:  Imane Khelif
 Women's Middleweight winner:  Elena Gapeshina

Men's

 Men's Flyweight winner:  Azat Usamaliev
 Men's Light Welterweight winner:  Hakan Dogan
 Men's Middleweight winner:  Francisco Daniel Verón
 Men's Heavyweight winner:  Abzal Kuttybekov

 Men's Battam winner:  Nirco Cuello
 Men's Welterweight winner:  Darkhan Dusebay
 Men's Light Heavyweight winner:  Bayram Malkan
 Men's Super Heavyweight winner:  Berat Acar

 1 – 7 April: International boxing tournament (group A) dedicated to the memory of the honored coach of Ukraine Nikolai Manger in  Kherson
 18 – 26 April: International Boxing Tournament "St. Petersburg Governor's Cup" in  Saint Petersburg
 22 – 28 April: 58th Belgrade Winner in  Belgrade
 3 – 5 May: Open regional Boxing Tournament devoted to Victory Day in  Gomel

Bridge

Canadian football
12 December – 108th Grey Cup: Winnipeg Blue Bombers defeat the Hamilton Tiger-Cats, 33–25 (in overtime).

Canoeing
12 – 14 March: 2021 Oceania Canoe Slalom Championships in  Auckland
K1 winners:  Callum Gilbert (m) /  Luuka Jones (f)
C1 winners:  Finn Anderson (m) /  Luuka Jones (f)
6 – 9 May: 2021 European Canoe Slalom Championships in  Ivrea
K1 winners:  Vít Přindiš (m) /  Corinna Kuhnle (f)
C1 winners:  Denis Gargaud Chanut (m) /  Miren Lazkano (f)
Extreme winners:  Vít Přindiš (m) /  Kateřina Minařík Kudějová (f)
11 June – 12 September: 2021 Canoe Slalom World Cup
K1 winners:  Vít Přindiš (m) /  Jessica Fox (f)
C1 winners:  Denis Gargaud Chanut (m) /  Tereza Fišerová (f)
Extreme winners:  Vít Přindiš (m) /  Caroline Trompeter (f)
6 – 11 July: 2021 World Junior and U23 Canoe Slalom Championships in  Ljubljana
K1 winners:  Jakub Krejčí (m U23) /  Titouan Castryck (m jr) /  Coline Charel (f U23) /  Evy Leibfarth (f jr)
C1 winners:  Nicolas Gestin (m U23) /  Martino Barzon (m jr) /  Bethan Forrow (f U23) /  Klára Kneblová (f jr)
Extreme winners:  Dimitri Marx (m U23) /  Kaelin Friedenson (m jr) /  Nikita Setchell (f U23) /  Jessica Duc (f jr)
3 – 6 September: 2021 ICF World Junior and U23 Canoe Sprint Championships in  Montemor-o-Velho
16 – 19 September: 2021 ICF Canoe Sprint World Championships in  Copenhagen
22 – 26 September: 2021 ICF Canoe Slalom World Championships in  Bratislava
K1 winners:  Boris Neveu (m) /  Ricarda Funk (f)
C1 winners:  Václav Chaloupka (m) /  Elena Apel (f)
Extreme winners:  Joe Clarke (m) /  Jessica Fox (f)
22 – 26 September: 2021 Wildwater Canoeing World Championships in  Bratislava
30 September – 3 October: 2021 ICF Canoe Marathon World Championships in  Pitesti
Cancelled: 2021 ICF Canoe Polo World Championships in  Rome

Cheerleading
TBD: 2021 The Cheerleading Worlds

Chess
 19 – 27 April: Candidates Tournament 2020–2021 (2nd half) in  Yekaterinburg  
 24 November – 12 December: World Chess Championship 2021 in  Dubai
  Magnus Carlsen defeated  Ian Nepomniachtchi, 7½–3½.
 25 – 31 December: World Blitz and Rapid Chess Championships 2021 in  Warsaw

Cricket
2019–2021 ICC World Test Championship Final in  England
 2021 ICC Men's T20 World Cup in  United Arab Emirates and  Oman

Cross-country skiing
 8 – 14 February: 2021 Nordic Junior World Ski Championships in  Vuokatti
 Junior Sprint Classic winners:  Niilo Moilainen (m) /  Monika Skinder (f)
 U23 Sprint Classic winners:  Alexander Terentev (m) /  Lisa Lohmann (f)
 Men's Junior 10 km Freestyle winner:  Martin Kirkeberg Mørk
 Women's Junior 5 km Freestyle winner:  Veronika Stepanova
 Men's U23 15 km Freestyle winner:  Hugo Lapalus
 Women's U23 10 km Freestyle winner:  Izabela Marcisz
 Men's Junior 30 km Mass Start Classic winner:  Alexander Ivshin
 Women's Junior 15 km Mass Start Classic winner:  Margrethe Bergane
 Mixed U23 4x5 km Relay winners: 
 Men's Junior 4x5 km Relay winners: 
 Women's Junior 4x3.3 km Relay winners: 
 24 February – 7 March: FIS Nordic World Ski Championships 2021 in  Oberstdorf
 Sprint classical winners:  Johannes Høsflot Klæbo (m) /  Jonna Sundling (f)
 Men's 30 km skiathlon winner:  Alexander Bolshunov
 Women's 15 km skiathlon winner:  Therese Johaug
 Team sprint freestyle winners:  (Erik Valnes & Johannes Høsflot Klæbo) (m) /  (Maja Dahlqvist & Jonna Sundling) (f)
 Men's 15 km freestyle individual winner:  Hans Christer Holund
 Women's 10 km freestyle individual winner:  Therese Johaug
 Men's 4 × 10 km relay winners:  (Paal Golberg, Emil Iversen, Hans Christer Holund, Johannes Høsflot Klæbo)
 Women's 4 × 5 km relay winners:  (Tiril Udnes Weng, Heidi Weng, Therese Johaug, Helene Marie Fossesholm)
 Men's 50 km classical mass start winner:  Emil Iversen
 Women's 30 km classical mass start winner:  Therese Johaug

2021 Tour de Ski
 1 – 3 January: TdS #1 in  Val Müstair
 Sprint Freestyle winners:  Federico Pellegrino (m) /  Linn Svahn (f)
 Men's 15 km Classic Mass Start winner:  Alexander Bolshunov
 Women's 10 km Classic Mass Start winner:  Linn Svahn
 Men's 15 km Freestyle Pursuit winner:  Alexander Bolshunov
 Women's 10 km Freestyle Pursuit winner:  Jessie Diggins
 5 & 6 January: TdS #2 in  Toblach
 Men's 15 km Freestyle winner:  Alexander Bolshunov
 Women's 10 km Freestyle winner:  Jessie Diggins
 Men's 15 km Classic Pursuit winner:  Alexander Bolshunov
 Women's 10 km Classic Pursuit winner:  Yuliya Stupak
 8 – 10 January: TdS #3 in  Val di Fiemme
 Men's 15 km Classic Mass Start winner:  Alexander Bolshunov
 Women's 10 km Classic Mass Start winner:  Natalya Nepryayeva
 Sprint Classic winners:  Oskar Svensson (m) /  Linn Svahn
 Men's 10 km Classic Mass Start Climb winner:  Denis Spitsov
 Women's 10 km Classic Mass Start Climb winner:  Ebba Andersson
 Overall winners:  Alexander Bolshunov (m) /  Jessie Diggins (f)

2020–21 FIS Cross-Country World Cup
 27–29 November 2020: WC #1 in  Ruka
 Sprint Classic winners:  Erik Valnes (m) /  Linn Svahn (f)
 Men's 15 km Classic winner:  Johannes Høsflot Klæbo
 Women's 10 km Classic winner:  Therese Johaug
 Men's 15 km Freestyle Pursuit winner:  Hans Christer Holund
 Women's 10 km Freestyle Pursuit winner:  Therese Johaug
 12 & 13 December 2020: WC #2 in  Davos
 Sprint Freestyle winners:  Federico Pellegrino (m) /  Rosie Brennan (f)
 Men's 15 km Freestyle winner:  Alexander Bolshunov
 Women's 10 km Freestyle winner:  Rosie Brennan
 19 & 20 December 2020: WC #3 in  Dresden
 Sprint Freestyle winners:  Federico Pellegrino (m) /  Nadine Fähndrich (f)
 Team Sprint Freestyle winners:  I (Alexander Bolshunov, Gleb Retivykh) (m) /  I (Laurien van der Graaff, Nadine Fähndrich)
 23 & 24 January: WC #7 in  Lahti
 Men's 30 km Skiathlon winner:  Emil Iversen
 Women's 15 km Skiathlon winner:  Therese Johaug
 Men's 4 × 7.5 km Relay C/F winners:  (Pål Golberg, Emil Iversen, Sjur Røthe, Simen Hegstad Krüger)
 Women's 4 × 5 km Relay C/F winners:  (Tiril Udnes Weng, Therese Johaug, Helene Marie Fossesholm, Heidi Weng)
 29 – 31 January: WC #8 in  Falun
 Men's 15 km Freestyle winner:  Alexander Bolshunov
 Women's 10 km Freestyle winner:  Jessie Diggins
 Men's 15 km Classic Mass Start winner:  Alexander Bolshunov
 Women's 10 km Classic Mass Start winner:  Linn Svahn
 Sprint Classic winners:  Johannes Høsflot Klæbo (m) /  Linn Svahn
 6 & 7 February: WC #9 in  Ulricehamn
 Sprint Freestyle winners:  Oskar Svensson (m) /  Maja Dahlqvist (f)
 Team Sprint Freestyle winners:  I (Francesco de Fabiani, Federico Pellegrino) (m) /  (Eva Urevc, Anamarija Lampič)
 13 & 14 March: WC #10 in  Engadin (final)
 Men's 15 km C Mass Start winner:  Alexander Bolshunov
 Women's 10 km C Mass Start winner:  Yuliya Stupak
 Men's 50 km F Pursuit winner:  Simen Hegstad Krüger
 Women's 30 km F Pursuit:  Heidi Weng

2020–21 FIS Cross-Country Continental Cup

2020–21 OPA Alpen Cross Country Cup
 5 & 6 December 2020: OPA #1 in  Ulrichen
 Men's 1.5 Sprint Freestyle winner:  Artem Maltsev
 Women's 1.3 Sprint Freestyle winner:  Nadine Fähndrich
 Men's 15 km Freestyle winner:  Artem Maltsev
 Women's 10 km Freestyle winner:  Francesca Franchi
 18 – 20 December 2020: OPA #2 in  Formazza
 Men's 15 km Classic winner:  Imanol Rojo
 Women's 10 km Classic winner:  Anna Comarella
 Men's 20 km Freestyle Must Start winner:  Adrien Backscheider
 Women's 15 km Freestyle Must Start winner:  Ilaria Debertolis
 6 & 7 March: OPA #3 in  Prémanon
 Men's 15 km Freestyle winner:  Gérard Agnellet
 Women's 10 km Freestyle winner:  Coralie Bentz
 Men's 15 km Classic Pursuit winner:  Cedric Steiner
 Women's 10 km Classic Pursuit winner:  Coralie Bentz
 12 – 14 March: OPA #4 in  Pokljuka
 Sprint Freestyle winners:  Lucas Chanavat (m) /  Coletta Rydzek (f)
 Men's 15 km Classic winner:  Andreas Katz
 Women's 10 km Classic winner:  Katherine Sauerbrey
 Men's 15 km Freestyle Pursuit winner:  Friedrich Moch
 Women's 10 km Freestyle Pursuit winner:  Lisa Lohmann

2021 FIS Cross Country Balkan Cup
 16 & 17 January: BC #1 in  Ravna Gora
 Men's 15 km Classic winner:  Paul Constantin Pepene
 Women's 5 km Classic winner:  Vedrana Malec
 1.5 Sprint Freestyle winners:  Raul Mihai Popa (m) /  Nika Jagečić (f)
 30 & 31 January: BC #2 in  Zlatibor
 Men's 10 km Classic winner:  Paul Constantin Pepene
 Women's 5 km Classic winner:  Varvara Prokhorova
 3 & 4 February: BC #3 in  Mavrovo
 Men's 10 km Freestyle winners:  Krešimir Crnković (2 times)
 Women's 5 km Freestyle winners:  Vedrana Malec (2 times)
 6 & 7 February: BC #4 in  3–5 Pigadia
 Event cancelled.
 19 & 20 February: BC #5 in  Dvorista/Pale
 Men's 10 km Freestyle winners:  Krešimir Crnković (2 times)
 Women's 5 km Freestyle winners:  Anika Kožica (No. 1) /  Tena Hadžić (No. 2)
 13 & 14 March: BC #6 in  Fundata
 Men's 10 km Classic winner:  Paul Constantin Pepene
 Women's 5 km Classic winner:  Tímea Lőrincz
 Men's 10 km Freestyle winner:  Paul Constantin Pepene
 Women's 5 km Freestyle winner  Tímea Lőrincz
 18 – 20 March: BC #7 in  Bolu-Gerede (final)
 Men's 10 km C winner:  Paul Constantin Pepene
 Women's 5 km Classic winner:  Kaidy Kaasiku
 Men's 10 km F Freestyle winner:  Paul Constantin Pepene
 Women's 5 km Freestyle winner  Kaidy Kaasiku
 Men's Sprint F winner:  Paul Constantin Pepene
 Women's 5 km C winner:  Kaidy Kaasiku

2020–21 East European Cup
 29 November – 2 December 2020: EEC #1 in  Vershina Tea
 Men's 1.7 Sprint Freestyle winner:  Denis Filimonov
 Women's 1.5 Sprint Freestyle winner:  Marina Chernousova
 Men's 15 km Classic winner:  Ivan Kirillov
 Women's 10 km Classic winner:  Liliya Vasilyeva
 Men's 1.7 Sprint Classic winner:  Andrey Kuznetsov
 Women's 1.5 Sprint Classic winner:  Anastasiya Faleeva
 Men's 15 km Freestyle winner:  Artem Nikolaev
 Women's 10 km Freestyle winner:  Liliya Vasilyeva
 23 – 27 December 2020: EEC #2 in  Krasnogorsk
 1.4 km Freestyle winners:  Denis Filimonov (m) /  Anastasia Kirillova (f)
 1.4 Sprint Classic winners:  Sergey Ardashev (m) /  Olga Tsareva (f)
 Men's 15 km Freestyle winner:  Dmitriy Bagrashov
 Women's 10 km Freestyle winner:  Ekaterina Smirnova
 Men's 15 km Classic winner:  Ilia Poroshkin
 Women's 10 km Classic winner:  Nataliya Mekryukova
 4 – 7 January: EEC #3 in  Minsk/Raubichi
 1.5 km Sprint Classic winners:  Anton Timashov (m) /  Anastasia Kirillova (f)
 Men's 10.0 km Classic winner:  Andrey Larkov
 Women's 5.0 km Classic winner:  Anastasia Kirillova 
 Men's 10.0 km Freestyle winner:  Anton Timashov
 Women's 5.0 km Freestyle winner:  Liliya Vasilyeva
 22 January: EEC #4 in  Krasnogorsk
 1.4 km Freestyle winners:  Andrey Krasnov (m) /  Anastasia Kirillova (f)
 5 – 7 February: EEC #5 in  Krasnogorsk
 Men's 15 km Classic winner:  Andrey Larkov
 Women's 10 km Classic winner:  Lidia Durkina
 1.5 Sprint Freestyle winners:  Andrey Krasnov (m) /  Elizaveta Shalaboda (f)
 11 – 13 February: EEC #6 in  Almaty
 Men's 1.6 km Sprint Classic winner:  Andrey Krasnov
 Women's 1.1 km Sprint Classic winner:  Lilia Vasilieva
 Men's 15 km Classic winner:  Artem Nikolaev
 Women's 10 km Classic winner:  Lilia Vasilieva
 Men's 20 km Freestyle Mass Start winner:  Ivan Kirillov
 Women's 15 km Freestyle Mass Start winner:  Lilia Vasilieva
 27 February – 3 March: EEC #7 in  Syktyvkar (final)
 Men's 15 km Classic winner:  Ilya Poroshkin
 Women's 10 km Classic winner:  Alija Iksanova
 1.39 km Sprint Freestyle winners:  Fyodor Nazarov (m) /  Anna Grukhvina (f)
 Skiathlon winners:  Anton Timashov (m) /  Ekaterina Smirnova (f)

2021 FIS Cross Country Far East Cup
 19 & 20 December 2020: FEC #1 in  Alpencia
 Event cancelled.
 25 – 27 December 2020: FEC #2 in  Otoineppu
 Event cancelled.
 6 January: FEC #3 in  Sapporo
 Event cancelled.
 3 & 4 February: FEC #4 in  Alpencia
 Men's 10 km Classic winner:  Lee Jin-bok
 Women's 5 km Classic winner:  Lee Chae-won
 Men's 10 km Freestyle winner:  Kim Eun-ho
 Women's 5 km Freestyle winner:  Lee Chae-won
 12 & 13 February: FEC #5 in  Hakusan Shiramine Onsen (final)
 Men's 15 km Classic winner:  Takatsugu Uda
 Women's 10 km Classic winner:  Rin Sobue

2020–21 FIS Cross Country Slavic Cup
 19 & 20 December 2020: SC #1 in  Zakopane #1
 Men's 10 km Classic winner:  Paul Constantin Pepene
 Women's 5 km Classic winner:  Patrīcija Eiduka
 Men's 15 km Freestyle winner:  Petr Knop
 Women's 10 km Freestyle winner:  Patrīcija Eiduka
 29 & 30 December 2020: SC #2 in  Štrbské Pleso #1
 Event cancelled.
 20 & 21 February: SC #3 in  Štrbské Pleso #2
 Event cancelled.
 20 & 21 March: SC #4 in  Zakopane #2
 1.2 Sprint Classic winners:  Tomáš Kalivoda (m) /  Alena Procházková (f)
 Men's 30 km Freestyle Must Start winner:  Petr Knop 
 Women's 15 km Freestyle Must Start winner:  Alena Procházková
 27 March: SC #5 in  Kremnica (final)
 Event cancelled.

2021 FIS Cross Country North American Cup
 7 – 10 January: NAC #1 at the  Whistler Olympic Park (final)
 Event cancelled.

Cue sports
 7 – 11 December: 2021 UMB World Three-cushion Championship in  Sharm el-Sheikh
  Dick Jaspers defeated  Murat Naci Çoklu, 50–47.

Curling

 2 – 11 April 2021: 2021 World Men's Curling Championship in  Calgary, Canada
  defeated , 10–5, to win Sweden's third consecutive and tenth overall World Men's Curling Championship title.
  took third place.
 30 April – 9 May 2021: 2021 World Women's Curling Championship in  Calgary, Canada
 17 – 23 May 2021: 2021 World Mixed Doubles Curling Championship in  Aberdeen, Scotland

2020–21 curling season

Cycle ball

Cycling — BMX
TBD: 2021 UCI BMX World Championships in Arnhem, Netherlands

International BMX events

2021 UCI BMX Supercross World Cup

Cycling – Cross
Continental and World Championships
 7 & 8 November 2020: 2020 UEC Cyclo-cross European Championships in  's-Hertogenbosch
 Elite winners:  Eli Iserbyt (m) /  Ceylin del Carmen Alvarado (f)
 U23 winners:  Ryan Kamp (m) /  Puck Pieterse (f)
 30 & 31 January: 2021 UCI Cyclo-cross World Championships in  Ostend
 Elite winners:  Mathieu van der Poel (m) /  Lucinda Brand (f)
 U23 winners:  Pim Ronhaar (m) /  Fem van Empel (f)

2020–21 UCI Cyclo-cross World Cup
 29 November 2020: WC #1 in  Tábor
 Elite winners:  Michael Vanthourenhout (m) /  Lucinda Brand (f)
 U23 winner:  Thomas Mein
 Juniors winners:  Matěj Stránský (b) /  Zoe Backstedt (f)
 20 December 2020: WC #2 in  Namur
 Elite winners:  Mathieu van der Poel (m) /  Lucinda Brand (f)
 27 December 2020: WC #3 in  Dendermonde
 Elite winners:  Wout van Aert (m) /  Lucinda Brand (f)
 3 January: WC #4 in  Hulst
 Elite winners:  Mathieu van der Poel (m) /  Denise Betsema
 24 January: WC #5 in  Overijse (final)
 Elite winners:  Wout van Aert (m) /  Ceylin del Carmen Alvarado (f)

2020–21 Cyclo-cross Superprestige
 11 October 2020: Superprestige #1 in  Gieten
 Elite winners:  Toon Aerts (m) /  Ceylin del Carmen Alvarado (f)
 24 October 2020: Superprestige #2 in  Oostkamp
 Elite winners:  Eli Iserbyt (m) /  Ceylin del Carmen Alvarado (f)
 Juniors winner:  Jente Michels
 11 November 2020: Superprestige #3 in  Niel
 Elite winners:  Laurens Sweeck (m) /  Lucinda Brand (f)
 22 November 2020: Superprestige #4 in  Merksplas
 Elite winners:  Michael Vanthourenhout (m) /  Lucinda Brand (f)
 6 December 2020: Superprestige #5 in  Boom
 Elite winners:  Eli Iserbyt (m) /  Lucinda Brand (f)
 13 December 2020: Superprestige #6 in  Gavere
 Elite winners:  Tom Pidcock (m) /  Lucinda Brand (f)
 26 December 2020: Superprestige #7 in  Heusden-Zolder
 Elite winners:  Mathieu van der Poel (m) /  Lucinda Brand (f)
 6 February: Superprestige #8 in  Middelkerke (final)
 Winners:  Laurens Sweeck (m) /  Denise Betsema (f)

13 September 2020: EKZ CrossTour #1 in  Baden
 Elite winners:  Lars Forster (m) /  Elisabeth Brandau (f)
 Juniors winner:  Aaron Dockx
 18 October 2020: EKZ CrossTour #2 in  Bern
 Elite winners:  Michael Vanthourenhout (m) /  Denise Betsema (f)
 Juniors winner:  Nils Aebersold
 2 January: EKZ CrossTour #3 in  Hittnau (final)
 Elite winners:  Kevin Kuhn (m) /  Christine Majerus (f)
 Juniors winner:  Finn Treudler

26 September 2020: Ethias Cross #1 in  Lokeren
 Elite winners:  Eli Iserbyt (m) /  Aniek van Alphen (f)
 3 October 2020: Ethias Cross #2 in  Kruibeke
 Elite winners:  Toon Aerts (m) /  Lucinda Brand (f)
 17 October 2020: Ethias Cross #3 in  Beringen
 Elite winners:  Toon Aerts (m) /  Denise Betsema (f)
 Juniors winner:  Lorenzo Masciarelli
 14 November 2020: Ethias Cross #4 in  Leuven
 Elite winners:  Laurens Sweeck (m) /  Ceylin del Carmen Alvarado (f)
 22 December 2020: Ethias Cross #5 in  Essen
 Elite winners:  Mathieu van der Poel (m) /  Marianne Vos (f)
 30 December 2020: Ethias Cross #6 in  Bredene
 Elite winners:  Mathieu van der Poel (m) /  Kata Blanka Vas (f)
 13 February: Ethias Cross #7 in  Eeklo
 Elite winners:  Quinten Hermans (m) /  Denise Betsema (f)
 20 February: Ethias Cross #8 in  Sint-Niklaas (final)
 Elite winners:  Eli Iserbyt (m) /  Denise Betsema (f)

26 September 2020: Toi Toi Cup #1 in  Mladá Boleslav
 Elite winners:  Michael Boroš (m) /  Sara Casasola (f)
 Juniors winners:  Matěj Stránský (b) /  Julia Kopecky (g)
 27 September 2020: Toi Toi Cup #2 in  Holé Vrchy
 Elite winners:  Lander Loockx (m) /  Sara Casasola (f)
 Juniors winners:  Matěj Stránský (b) /  Julia Kopecky (g)
 15 November 2020: Toi Toi Cup #3 in  Hlinsko
 Cancelled.
 17 November 2020: Toi Toi Cup #4 in  Rýmařov
 Elite winners:  Michael Boroš (m) /  Kata Blanka Vas (f)
 Juniors winners:  Matěj Stránský (b) /  Anna Růžičková (g)
 22 November 2020: Toi Toi Cup #5 in  Jičín
 Elite winners:  Jakob Dorigoni (m) /  Joyce Vanderbeken (f)
 Juniors winners:  Matěj Stránský (b) /  Julia Kopecky (g)
 12 December 2020: Toi Toi Cup #6 in  Kolín (final)
 Elite winners:  Marek Konwa (m) /  Pavla Havlíková (f)

31 October 2020: X2O Badkamers Trofee #1 in  Oudenaarde
 Elite winners:  Eli Iserbyt (m) /  Annemarie Worst (f)
 28 November 2020: X2O Badkamers Trofee #2 in  Kortrijk
 Elite winners:  Eli Iserbyt (m) /  Lucinda Brand (f)
 12 December 2020: X2O Badkamers Trofee #3 in  Antwerp
 Elite winners:  Mathieu van der Poel (m) /  Denise Betsema (f)
 23 December 2020: X2O Badkamers Trofee #4 in  Herentals
 Elite winners:  Wout van Aert (m) /  Ceylin del Carmen Alvarado (f)
 1 January: X20 Badkamers Trofee #5 in  Baal
 Elite winners:  Mathieu van der Poel (m) /  Ceylin del Carmen Alvarado (f)
 23 January: X2O Badkamers Trofee #6 in  Hamme
 Elite winners:  Mathieu van der Poel (m) /  Ceylin del Carmen Alvarado (f)
 7 February: X2O Badkamers Trofee #7 in  Lille
 Elite winners:  Laurens Sweeck (m) /  Ceylin del Carmen Alvarado (f)
 14 February: X2O Badkamers Trofee #8 in  Brussels (final)
 Elite winners:  Toon Aerts (m) /  Ceylin del Carmen Alvarado (f)

Cycling — Mountain Bike

2020 Summer Olympics
 26 & 27 July: Mountain Bike ath 2020 Summer Olimpics in  Tokyo

International mountain biking events
 24 – 28 March: American Mountain Bike Continental Championships in  Salinas (XCO/XCR/XCE)
 Elite XCO winners:  Gerardo Ulloa (m) /  Daniela Campuzano (f)
 U23 XCO winners:  Martín Vidaurre Kossman (m) /  Savilia Blunk (f)
 Junior XCO winners:  Camilo Gómez (m) /  Ruth Holcomb (f)
 Elite XCE winners:  Jacob Morales Ortega (m) /  Kiara Marrero (f)
 Elite XCC winners:  Gerardo Ulloa (m) /  Kelsey Urban (f)
 XCR winners:  (Russell Finsterwald, Bradyn Lange, Ruth Holcomb, Ethan Villaneda, Madigan Munro, Savilia Blunk)
 23 April: American Mountain Bike Continental Championships in  San Pedro de Atacama and Antofagasta (XCM)
 2 May: 2021 UCI Mountain Bike World Championships in  Graz (XCE)
 20 June: European Continental Championships in  Evolène (XCM)
 26 June: European Continental Championships in  Val d'Aran (Ultra XCM)
 8 – 11 July: European Continental Championships in  Novi Sad (XCO/XCR/XCE)
 27 July – 1 August: European Continental Championships in  Maribor (DHI)
 17 – 22 August: UCI Mountain Bike Masters World Championships in  Pra-Loup
 25 – 29 August: 2021 UCI Mountain Bike World Championships in  Val di Sole (XCO/XCC/XCR/DHI/E-MTB/4X)
 25 & 26 September: UCI Mountain Bike Masters World Championships in  II Ciocco
 2 October: UCI Mountain Bike Marathon World Championships in  Capoliveri

2021 UCI Mountain Bike World Cup
 Winners:  Jérôme Gilloux (m) /  Sofia Wiedenroth (f)
 Winners:  Jérôme Gilloux (m) /  Sofia Wiedenroth (f)
 8 & 9 May: WC #2 in  Albstadt (XCC/XCO)
 Winners:  Mathieu van der Poel (m) /  Pauline Ferrand-Prévot (f) (XCC)
 15 & 16 May: WC #3 in  Nové Město na Moravě (XCO)
 22 & 23 May: WC #4 in  Fort William (DHI)
 12 & 13 June: WC #5 in  Leogang (XCO & DHI)
 3 & 4 July: WC #6 in  Les Gets (XCO & DHI)
 8 August: WC #7 in  Leuven (XCE)
 15 August: WC #8 in  Oudenaarde (XCE)
 4 & 5 September: WC #9 in  Lenzerheide (XCO & DHI)
 12 September: WC #10 in  Winterberg (XCE)
 17 September: WC #11 in  Jablines-Annet (XCE)
 18 & 19 September: WC #12 in  Snowshoe (XCO & DHI)
 19 September: WC #13 in  Valkenswaard (XCE)
 2 October: WC #14 in  Barcelona (XCE)

Cycling – Para-cycling
TBD: 2021 UCI Para-cycling Track World Championships
TBD: 2021 UCI Para-cycling Road World Championships

Cycling – Road
 2 – 6 March: 2021 African Road Championships in  Giza
 Senior Road Race winners:  Ryan Gibbons (m) /  Carla Oberholzer (f)
 Junior Road Race winners:  Etienne Tuyizere (m) /  Chanté Olivier (f)
 Senior ITT winners:  Ryan Gibbons (m) /  Carla Oberholzer (f)
 Junior ITT winners:  Pedri Crause (m) /  Chanté Olivier (f)
 Senior TTT winners:  (Ryan Gibbons, Kent Main, Gustav Basson, Jason Oosthuizen) (m) /  (Frances Janse van Rensburg, Carla Oberholzer, Hayley Preen, Maroesjka Matthee) (f)
 Junior TTT winners:  (Salah Eddine Ayoubi Cherki, Abdelkrim Ferkous, Mohamed Redouane Brinis, Khaled Mansouri) (m) /  (Chanté Olivier, Ainsli de Beer, Amber Hindmarch, McKenzie Pedro) (f)
 Mixed TTT winners:  (Gustav Basson, Carla Oberholzer, Frances Janse van Rensburg, Hayley Preen, Ryan Gibbons, Kent Main)
TBD: 2021 UCI Road World Championships in Bruges and Leuven, Belgium

2021 UCI World Tour
 21 – 27 February:  2021 UAE Tour Winner:  Tadej Pogačar
 27 February:  2021 Omloop Het Nieuwsblad Winner:  Davide Ballerini
 6 March:  2021 Strade Bianche Winner:  Mathieu van der Poel
 7 – 14 March:  2021 Paris–Nice Winner:  Maximilian Schachmann
 10 – 16 March:  2021 Tirreno–Adriatico Winner:  Tadej Pogačar
 20 March:  2021 Milan–San Remo Winner:  Jasper Stuyven
 22 – 28 March:  2021 Volta a Catalunya Winner:  Adam Yates
 24 March:  2021 Classic Brugge–De Panne Winner:  Sam Bennett
 26 March:  2021 E3 Saxo Bank Classic Winner:  Kasper Asgreen
 28 March:  2021 Gent–Wevelgem Winner:  Wout van Aert
 31 March:  2021 Dwars door Vlaanderen Winner:  Dylan van Baarle
 4 April:  2021 Tour of Flanders Winner:  Kasper Asgreen
 5 – 10 April:  2021 Tour of the Basque Country Winner:  Primož Roglič
 18 April:  2021 Amstel Gold Race Winner:  Wout van Aert
 25 April:  2021 Liège–Bastogne–Liège Winner:  Tadej Pogačar

2021 UCI Women's World Tour
 6 March:  2021 Strade Bianche Winner:  Chantal van den Broek-Blaak
 21 March:  2021 Trofeo Alfredo Binda-Comune di Cittiglio Winner:  Elisa Longo Borghini
 25 March:  2021 Classic Brugge–De Panne Winner:  Grace Brown
 28 March:  2021 Gent–Wevelgem Winner:  Marianne Vos
 4 April:  2021 Tour of Flanders for Women Winner:  Annemiek van Vleuten
 18 April:  2021 Amstel Gold Race Winner:  Marianne Vos
 21 April:  2021 Flèche Wallonne Winner:  Anna van der Breggen
 25 April:  2021 Liège–Bastogne–Liège Winner:  Demi Vollering

Cycling – Track
 10 – 13 March: 2021 African Track Cycling Championships in  Cairo
  won overall gold medals tally and overall medal tally.
13–17 October: 2021 UCI Track Cycling World Championships in  Roubaix

International track cycling events

Darts

Professional Darts Corporation
15 December 2020 – 3 January 2021: 2021 PDC World Darts Championship in  London
 beat , 7–3.
29 – 31 January: 2021 Masters in  Milton Keynes
 beat , 11–8.
5 – 7 March: 2021 UK Open in  Milton Keynes
 beat , 11–5.
5 April – 28 May: 2021 Premier League Darts in  Milton Keynes
 beat , 11–5.
17 – 25 July: 2021 World Matchplay in  Blackpool
 beat , 18–9.
9 – 12 September: 2021 PDC World Cup of Darts in  Jena
 (Peter Wright & John Henderson) beat  (Mensur Suljović & Rowby-John Rodriguez), 3–1.
17 – 18 September: 2021 Nordic Darts Masters in  Copenhagen
 beat , 11–7.
3 – 9 October: 2021 World Grand Prix in  Leicester
 beat , 5–1.
14 – 17 October: 2021 European Championship in  Salzburg
 beat , 11–8.
29 – 31 October: 2021 World Series of Darts Finals in  Amsterdam
 beat , 11–6.
13 – 21 November: 2021 Grand Slam of Darts in  Wolverhampton
 beat , 16–8.
26 – 28 November: 2021 Players Championship Finals in  Minehead
 beat , 11–10.
28 November: 2021 PDC World Youth Championship in  Minehead
 beat , 6–4.

Dance sport
TBD: DanceSport at the 2021 World Games

Dodgeball
TBD: 2021 World Dodgeball Championships

Disc golf
PDGA Majors:

21–23 May:  United States Women's Disc Golf Championship:   Paige Pierce

22–26 June:  Professional Disc Golf World Championships: Men's:  James Conrad Women's:   Catrina Allen

6–9 October:  United States Disc Golf Championship:

Disc Golf Pro Tour:

25–28 February:  Las Vegas Challenge: Men's:  Eagle McMahon Women's:  Paige Pierce

12–14 March:  Waco Annual Charity Open: Men's:  Nikko Locastro Women's:  Kona Star Panis

16–18 April:  Jonesboro Open: Men's:  Ricky Wysocki Women's:  Catrina Allen

14–16 May:  OTB Open: Men's:  Eagle McMahon Women's:  Paige Pierce

4–6 June:  Portland Open: Men's:  Eagle McMahon Women's:   Paige Pierce

9–11 July:  Des Moines Challenge: Men's:  Paul McBeth Women's:  Missy Gannon

23–25 July:  Discraft Great Lakes Open: Men's:  Eagle McMahon Women's:  Kristin Tattar

30 July – 1 August:   The Preserve Championship: Men's:  Ricky Wysocki Women's:  Kristin Tattar

5–8 August:  Discraft Ledgestone Insurance Open: Men's:  Ricky Wysocki and  Calvin Heimburg Women's:  Paige Pierce

13–15 August:  Idlewild Open: Men's:  Kyle Klein Women's:  Paige Pierce

3–5 September:  MVP Open at Maple Hill: Men's:  Adam Hammes Women's:  Catrina Allen

9–12 September:  Green Mountain Championship: Men's:  Chris Dickerson Women's:  Hailey King

14–17 October:  Tour Championship:

PDGA National Tour:

26–28 March:  Texas State Disc Golf Championships: Men's:   Ricky Wysocki Women's:   Hailey King

28 April – 1 May:  Dynamic Discs Open: Men's:   Paul McBeth Women's:  Hailey King

28–30 May:  Santa Cruz Master's Cup: Men's:  Adam Hammes Women's:  Paige Pierce

27–29 August:  Delaware Disc Golf Challenge: Men's:  Connor O'Reilly Women's:  Catrina Allen

23–26 September:   Music City Open: Men's: Women's:

Equestrianism

Fencing

 3 – 11 April: 2021 Junior and Cadet World Fencing Championships in  Cairo

2020-21 Fencing World Cup

Men
Sabre
 11 – 14 March: WC #1 in  Budapest
 Individual winner:  Oh Sang-uk
 Teams winners: 

Épée
 19 – 23 March: WC #1 in  KAZ
 Individual winner:  Ihor Reizlin
 Teams winners: 

Women
Sabre
 11 – 14 March: WC #1 in  Budapest
 Individual winner:  Anna Márton
 Teams winners: 

Épée
 19 – 23 March: WC #1 in  KAZ
 Individual winner:  Choi In-jeong
 Teams winners:

2021 Grand Prix

Foil
 26 – 28 March: GP #1 in  Doha
 Winners:  Gerek Meinhardt (m) /  Inna Deriglazova (f)

Field Hockey
2021 Men's FIH Hockey Junior World Cup
2021 Women's FIH Hockey Junior World Cup

EHF
 2 – 5 April: 2021 Women's EuroHockey Club Trophy in  Boom
 2 – 5 April: Women's EuroHockey Club Challenge I in  Prague
 2 – 5 April: EuroHockey Club Trophy I in  Vienna
 2 – 5 April: EuroHockey Club Trophy II in  Plzeň
 3 – 5 April: 2021 Euro Hockey League (Final Four) in  Amsterdam
 In the final,  HC Bloemendaal defeated  Club Deportiu Terrassa, 5–2, to win their 4th Euro Hockey League.
  Royal Léopold Club took third place.
 3 – 5 April: 2021 Euro Hockey League Women (Final Four) in  Amsterdam
 20 – 23 May: EuroHockey Club Challenge I in  Lipovci

AfHF
 15 – 18 April: 2021 Men's Indoor African Cup and 2021 Women's Indoor African Cup in  Durban
 27 September – 3 October: 2021 Hockey Africa Cup for Club Champions in  Blantyre
 TBD: 2021 Junior Africa Hockey Cup in TBD place

PAHF
 22 – 27 June: 2021 Indoor Pan American Cup in  Philadelphia

Figure skating

International figure skating events

2020–21 ISU Figure Skating Championships
 22–28 March 2021: 2021 World Figure Skating Championships in  Stockholm, Sweden
 Men's winner:  Nathan Chen
 Ladies winner:  Anna Shcherbakova
 Pairs winners:  Anastasia Mishina / Aleksandr Galliamov
 Ice dance winners:  Victoria Sinitsina / Nikita Katsalapov

2020–21 ISU Grand Prix of Figure Skating
 23–24 October 2020: 2020 Skate America in  Las Vegas
 Men's winner:  Nathan Chen
 Ladies winner:  Mariah Bell
 Pairs winners:  Alexa Knierim / Brandon Frazier
 Ice dance winners:  Madison Hubbell / Zachary Donohue
 6–8 November 2020: 2020 Cup of China in  Chongqing
 Men winner:  Jin Boyang
 Ladies winner:  Chen Hongyi
 Pairs winners:  Peng Cheng / Jin Yang
 Ice dance winners:  Wang Shiyue / Liu Xinyu
 20–22 November 2020: 2020 Rostelecom Cup in  Moscow
 Men winner:  Mikhail Kolyada
 Ladies winner:  Elizaveta Tuktamysheva
 Pairs winners:  Aleksandra Boikova / Dmitrii Kozlovskii
 Ice dance winners:  Victoria Sinitsina / Nikita Katsalapov
 27–29 November 2020: 2020 NHK Trophy in  Osaka
 Men winner:  Yuma Kagiyama
 Ladies winner:  Kaori Sakamoto
 No pairs event held.
 Ice dance winners:  Misato Komatsubara / Tim Koleto

2020–21 ISU Challenger Series
 23–26 September 2020: 2020 CS Nebelhorn Trophy in  Oberstdorf
 Men winner:  Deniss Vasiļjevs
 Ladies winner:  Eva-Lotta Kiibus
 Pairs winners:  Rebecca Ghilardi / Filippo Ambrosini
 Ice dance winners:  Natálie Taschlerová / Filip Taschler
 15–17 October 2020: 2020 CS Budapest Trophy in  Budapest
 Men winner:  Daniel Grassl
 Ladies winner:  Loena Hendrickx
  No pairs event held.
 Ice dance winners:  Oleksandra Nazarova / Maxim Nikitin

Other
 15–18 April 2021: 2021 ISU World Team Trophy in Figure Skating  Osaka
 Team winners:  (Mikhail Kolyada, Evgeni Semenenko, Anna Shcherbakova, Elizaveta Tuktamysheva, Anastasia Mishina / Aleksandr Galliamov, Victoria Sinitsina / Nikita Katsalapov)

National figure skating events

Floorball

World
 25 – 29 August: 2021 Men's under-19 World Floorball Championships in  Brno
 In final,  defeated , 4–3, to win their 2nd Men's U19 World Floorball Championships.  took third place and  fourth place.
 1 – 5 September: 2020 Women's under-19 World Floorball Championships in  Uppsala (postponed from 2020)
 In final,  defeated , 4–3, to win their 2th Women's U19 World Floorball Championships.  took third place and  fourth place.
 27 November – 5 December: 2021 Women's World Floorball Championships in  Uppsala
 Champion: 
 3 – 11 December: 2020 Men's World Floorball Championships in  Helsinki (postponed from 2020)
 Champion: 
 Champions Cup – cancelled

Freestyle skiing
 9 February – 16 March: FIS Freestyle Ski and Snowboarding World Championships 2021 in  Idre,  Rogla,  Almaty and  Aspen
 Ski Cross winners:  Alex Fiva (m) /  Sandra Näslund (f)
 Slopestyle winners:  Andri Ragettli (m) /  Gu Ailing (f)
 Halfpipe winners:  Nico Porteous (m) /  Gu Ailing (f)
 Big Air winners:  Oliwer Magnusson (m) /  Anastasia Tatalina (f)
 Aerials winners:  Maxim Burov (m) /  Laura Peel (f)
 Team Aerials winners:  (Liubov Nikitina, Pavel Krotov, Maxim Burov)
 Moguls winners:  Mikaël Kingsbury (m) /  Perrine Laffont (f)
 Dual moguls winners:  Mikaël Kingsbury (m) /  Anastasia Smirnova (f)
 15 – 28 March: 2021 FIS Freestyle Junior World Ski Championships in  Krasnoyarsk
 Aerials winners:  Artem Potapov (m) /  Anastasiia Prytkova (f)
 Team aerials winners:  I (Artem Potapov, Anastasiia Prytkova, Arsenii Vagin)
 Moguls winners:  Nikita Andreev (m) /  Anri Kawamura (f)
 Dual moguls winners:  Shima Kawaoka (m) /  Viktoriia Lazarenko (f)
 Ski cross winners:  Oliver Vierthaler (m) /  Darya Melchakova (f)
 Team Ski Cross winners:  I (Oliver Vierthaler, Christina Födermayr)
 Halfpipe winners:  Henry Sildaru (m) /  Alexandra Glazkova (f)
 Slopestyle winners:  Matěj Švancer (m) /  Ksenia Orlova (f)
 Big Air winners:  Matěj Švancer (m) /  Ksenia Orlova (f)

2020–21 FIS Freestyle Ski World Cup
Big Air
7 & 8 January: WC #1 in  Kreischberg (final)
 Winners:  Birk Ruud (m) /  Giulia Tanno (f)

Slopestyle
 19 – 21 November 2020: WC #1 in  Stubai
 Winners:  Andri Ragettli (m) /  Tess Ledeux (f)
 18 – 20 March: WC #2 in  Aspen
 Winners:  Colby Stevenson (m) /  Tess Ledeux (f)

Ski Cross
 14 – 16 December 2020: WC #1 in  Arosa
 Winners #1:  David Mobärg (m) /  Alexandra Edebo (f)
 Winners #2:  Viktor Andersson (m) /  Fanny Smith (f)
 19 – 21 December 2020: WC #2 in  Val Thorens
 Winners #1:  Jonathan Midol (m) /  Fanny Smith (f)
 Winners #2:  Reece Howden (m) /  Katrin Ofner (f)
 Winners #3:  Reece Howden (m) /  Fanny Smith (f)
 29 – 31 January: WC #3 in  Feldberg
 Event cancelled.
 17 – 19 February: WC #4 in  Reiteralm
 Winners:  Johannes Rohrweck (m) /  Sandra Näslund (f)
 26 – 28 February: WC #4 in  Bakuriani
 Winners:  Florian Wilmsmann (m) /  Fanny Smith (f)
 Team winners:  1
 12 & 13 March: WC #5 in  Sunny Valley
 Winners:  Reece Howden (m) /  Fanny Smith (f)
 21 March: WC #6 in  Veysonnaz (final)

Moguls
 5 December 2020: WC #1 in  Ruka
 Winners:  Ikuma Horishima (m) /  Perrine Laffont (f)
 12 December 2020: WC #2 in  Idre Fjäll
 Winners:  Benjamin Cavet (m) /  Perrine Laffont (f)
 4 – 6 February: WC #3 in  Deer Valley
 Winners:  Mikaël Kingsbury (m) /  Perrine Laffont (f)

Dual Moguls
 13 December 2020: WC #1 in  Idre Fjäll
 Winners:  Matt Graham &  Ludvig Fjallstrom (m) /  Perrine Laffont (f)
 4 – 6 February: WC #2 in  Deer Valley
 Winners:  Mikaël Kingsbury (m) /  Kai Owens (f)

Aerials
 4 December 2020: WC #1 in  Ruka
 Winners:  Maxim Burov (m) /  Laura Peel (f)
 16 & 17 January: WC #3 in  Yaroslavl
 Men's winners:  Maxim Burov (2 times)
 Women's winners:  Laura Peel (No. 1) /  Megan Nick (No. 2)
 Team winners:  I (Anastasiia Prytkova, Maxim Burov, Pavel Krotov)
 23 January: WC #3 in  Moscow
 Winners:  Maxim Burov (m) /  Winter Vinecki (f)
 30 January: WC #4 in  Minsk
 Winners:  Maxim Burov (m) /  Megan Nick (f)
 4 – 6 February: WC #5 in  Deer Valley
 Winners:  Noé Roth (m) /  Danielle Scott (f)
 13 & 14 March: WC #6 in  Almaty (final)
 Winners:  Pirmin Werner (m) /  Marion Thénault (f)

Halfpipe
 19 – 21 March: WC #1 in  Aspen (final)
 Winners:  Aaron Blunck (m) /  Rachael Karker (f)

2020–21 FIS Freestyle Ski Europa Cup
Aerials
 11 & 12 December 2020: EC #1 in  Ruka
 Men's winners:  Noé Roth (2 times) 
 Women's winners:  Marion Thénault (No. 1) /  Laura Peel (No. 2)
 5 – 7 February: EC #2 in  Minsk
 Men's winners:  Ihar Drabiankou (No. 1) /  Maxim Gustik (No. 2)
 Women's winner:  Hanna Huskova (2 times)
 Teams winners:  II
 12 & 13 February: EC #3 in  Krasiya
 Men's winner:  Maksym Kuznietsov (2 times)
 Women's winner:  Valeryia Balmatava (2 times)
 28 February – 3 March: EC #4 in  Airolo
 Men's winner:  Noé Roth (2 times)
 Women's winner:  Danielle Scott (2 times)

Ski Cross
 9 & 10 January: EC #1 in  Reiteralm
 Men's winners:  Tim Hronek (No. 1) /  Tobias Müller (No. 2)
 Women's winners:  Daniela Maier (No. 1) /  Katrin Ofner (No. 2)
 6 & 7 February: EC #2 in  Crans-Montana
 Winners:  Adam Kappacher (m) /  Mylène Ballet Baz (f)
 6 & 7 March: EC #3 in  Reiteralm
 Men's winners:  Johannes Rohrweck (No. 1) /  Florian Wilmsmann (No. 2)
 Women's winners:  Katrin Ofner (No. 1) /  Courtney Hoffos (No. 2)
 12 & 13 March: EC #4 in  San Pellegrino Pass
 Men's winners:  Romain Mari (No. 1) /  Simone Deromedis (No. 2)
 Women's winners:  Saskja Lack (2 times)

Moguls
 30 & 31 January: EC #1 in  Åre/Duved
 Men's winners:  James Crozet (No. 1) /  Thibaud Mouille (No. 2)
 Women's winners:  Fantine Degroote (2 times)
 5 – 9 February: EC #2 in  Taivalkoski
 Men's winner:  Johannes Suikkari (4 times)
 Women's winners:  Fantine Degroote (3 times) /  Riikka Voutilainen (No. 2)
 13 & 14 February: EC #3 in  Jyväskylä
 Men's winners:  Olli Penttala (No. 1) /  Jimi Salonen (No. 2)
 Women's winners:  Ekaterina Ogneva (2 times)
 28 February – 3 March: EC #4 in  Airolo
 Men's winners:  Marius Bourdette (No. 1) /  Johannes Suikkari (No. 2)
 Women's winners:  Sophie Weese (No. 1) /  Hanna Weese (No. 2)

Halfpipe
 27 – 31 January: EC #1 in  Crans Montana
 Winners:  Robin Briguet (m) /  Saori Suzuki (f)
 7 March: EC #2 in  Leysin
 Winners:  Henry Sildaru (m) /  Michelle Rageth (f)

Slopestyle
 9 March: EC #1 in  Leysin
 Winners:  Valentin Morel (m) /  Elisa Maria Nakab (f)

Big Air
 6 & 7 February: EC #1 in  Les Arcs
 Winners:  Antoine Adelisse (m) /  Bérénice Dode (f)
 20 February: EC #2 in  Davos
 Winners:  Timothé Sivignon (m) /  Ksenia Orlova (f)
 5 March: EC #3 in  Götschen
 Winners:  Miro Tabanelli (m) /  Muriel Mohr (f)

2020–21 FIS Freestyle Ski North American Cup
Aerials
 5 – 9 January: NAC #1 at the  Utah Olympic Park #1
 Men's winners:  Derek Krueger (No. 1) /  Justin Schoenefeld (No. 2)
 Women's winners:  Megan Smallhouse (No. 1) /  Megan Nick (No. 2)
 13 & 14 February: NAC #2 at the  Utah Olympic Park #2
 Men's winners:  Émile Nadeau (No. 1) /  Sherzod Khashyrbayev (No. 2)
 Women's winners:  Zhanbota Aldabergenova (No. 1) /  Madison Varmette (No. 2)

Futsal

12 September – 3 October: 2021 FIFA Futsal World Cup in Lithuania

Goalball

Golf

2020–21 PGA Tour

Gymnastics

27–29 May: 2021 Aerobic Gymnastics World Championships in  Baku
18–20 June: 2021 Acrobatic Gymnastics World Championships in  Geneva
18–24 October: 2021 World Artistic Gymnastics Championships in  Kitakyushu
27–31 October: 2021 Rhythmic Gymnastics World Championships in  Kitakyushu
11–14 November: 2021 Trampoline Gymnastics World Championships in  Baku
Various dates: 2021 FIG Artistic Gymnastics World Cup series
Various dates: 2021 FIG Rhythmic Gymnastics World Cup series

Europe
21–25 April: 2021 European Artistic Gymnastics Championships in  Basel
29 April-2 May: 2021 European Trampoline Championships in  Sochi
9–13 June: 2021 Rhythmic Gymnastics European Championships in  Varna
24–26 September: 2021 Aerobic Gymnastics European Championships in  Pesaro
6–10 November: 2021 Acrobatic Gymnastics European Championships in  Pesaro

Handball
World
 14 – 31 January: 2021 World Men's Handball Championship in 
 2 – 19 December: 2021 World Women's Handball Championship in 
 4 – 10 October: 2021 IHF Men's Super Globe
TBD: 2021 IHF Women's Super Globe
2021 Men's Junior World Handball Championship
2021 IHF Men's Youth World Championship

EHF
National teams
 7 – 17 January: 2020 European Men's Under-20 Handball Championship in  Porec
 Event cancelled.

Club teams
 16 September 2020 – 13 June: 2020–21 EHF Champions League (final in  Cologne)
 12 September 2020 – 30 May: 2020–21 Women's EHF Champions League (final in  Budapest)
 20 August 2020 – TBD: 2020–21 EHF European League
 10 October 2020 – TBD: 2020–21 Women's EHF European League
 13 November 2020 – TBD: 2020–21 EHF European Cup
 10 October 2020 – TBD: 2020–21 Women's EHF European Cup

Regional leagues
 27 August 2020 – TBD: 2020–21 Mol Liga
 10 October 2020 – TBD: 2020–21 Bene League

Horse Racing

United States
US Triple Crown

 1 May: 2021 Kentucky Derby at  Churchill Downs
 15 May: 2021 Preakness Stakes at  Pimlico
 5 June: 2021 Belmont Stakes at  Belmont Park

Breeder's Cup

5–6 Nov: Breeder's Cup at  Del Mar Racetrack

Ice climbing

Ice hockey

 25 December 2020 – 5 January: 2021 World Junior Ice Hockey Championships in  Edmonton and Red Deer
 In the final, the  defeated  2–0 to win their fifth World Junior Ice Hockey Championships.
  took third place.
 6–16 May: 2021 IIHF Women's World Championship in Canada
 21 May – 6 June: 2021 IIHF World Championship in Latvia and Belarus
2021 World Junior Ice Hockey Championships
2021 IIHF World U18 Championships
2021 IIHF World Women's U18 Championship

National Hockey League
 13 January – 8 May: 2020-21 NHL season
 21 February: 2021 NHL Stadium Series 
 23–24 July: 2021 NHL Entry Draft

Hockey Europe
 3 October 2020 – 21 May: 2020–21 Alps Hockey League

Indoor Soccer
TBD: 2021 WMF Women's World Cup
WMF U23 World Cup

Judo
 11 – 13 January: 2021 Judo World Masters in  Doha
  won overall gold medals tally. France,  and  won overall medal tally.
 6 – 13 June: 2021 World Judo Championships in  Budapest

2021 IJF World Tour
 18 – 20 February:  2021 Judo Grand Slam Tel Aviv
 Extra-lightweight winners:  Davud Mammadov (m) /  Shirine Boukli (f)
 Half-lightweight winners:  Alberto Gaitero (m) /  Chelsie Giles (f)
 Lightweight winners:  Alexandru Raicu (m) /  Timna Nelson-Levy (f)
 Half-middleweight winners:  Sharofiddin Boltaboev (m) /  Tina Trstenjak (f)
 Middleweight winners:  Lasha Bekauri (m) /  Margaux Pinot (f)
 Half-heavyweight winners:  Michael Korrel (m) /  Anna-Maria Wagner (f)
 Heavyweight winners:  Gela Zaalishvili (m) /  Romane Dicko (f)
 5 – 7 March:  2021 Judo Grand Slam Tashkent
 Men's Half-lightweight winner  Ryuju Nagayama 
 Women's Extra-lightweight winner:  Mönkhbatyn Urantsetseg
 Lightweight winners:  An Baul (m) /  Uta Abe (f)
 Half-middleweight winners:  Tsend-Ochiryn Tsogtbaatar (m) /  Momo Tamaoki (f)
 Middleweight winners:  Christian Parlati (m) /  Miku Tashiro (f)
 Half-heavyweight winners:  Kenta Nagasawa (m) /  Chizuru Arai (f)
 Heavyweight winners  Kokoro Kageura (m) /  Akira Sone (f)
 26 – 28 March:  2021 Judo Grand Slam Tbilisi
 Extra Lightweight winners:  Temur Nozadze (m) /  Mönkhbatyn Urantsetseg (f)
 Half Lightweight winners:  Sardor Nurillaev (m) /  Odette Giuffrida (f)
 Lightweight winners:  Tsend-Ochiryn Tsogtbaatar (m) /  Nora Gjakova (f)
 Half Middleweight winners:  Sami Chouchi (m) /  Catherine Beauchemin-Pinard (f)
 Middleweight winners:  Marcus Nyman (m) /  Maria Portela (f)
 Half Heavyweight winners:  Shady El Nahas (m) /  Natascha Ausma (f)
 Heavyweight winners:  Gela Zaalishvili (m) /  Shiyan Xu (f)
 1 – 3 April:  2021 Judo Grand Slam Antalya
 5 – 7 May:  2021 Judo Grand Slam Kazan
 24 – 26 September:  2021 Judo Grand Prix Zagreb
 16 & 17 October:  2021 Judo Grand Slam Paris
 5 – 7 November:  2021 Judo Grand Slam Baku (final)

2021 European Open
 27 & 28 February: European Open #1 in  Prague
 Extra-lightweight winners:  Emiel Jaring (m) /  Monica Ungureanu (f)
 Half-lightweight winners:  Lucian Borş Dumitrescu (m) /  Amber Ryheul (f)
 Lightweight winners:  Adrian Sulca (m) /  Pleuni Cornelisse (f)
 Half-middleweight winners:  Benedek Tóth (m) /  Geke van den Berg (f)
 Middleweight winners:  Péter Sáfrány (f) /  Lara Cvjetko (f)
 Half-heavyweight winners:  Zalán Ohát (m) /  Renée van Harselaar (f)
 Heavyweight winners:  Lukáš Krpálek (m) /  Helena Vuković (f)

2021 European Cup
 20 & 21 March: European Cup #1 in  Sarajevo

2021 Panamerican Open
 6 & 7 March: Panamerican Open #1 in  Santiago
 13 & 14 March: Panamerican Open #2 in  Lima
 20 & 21 March: Panamerican Open #3 in  TBD

2021 Asian Open
 13 & 14 March: Asian Open #1 in  Aktau
 Extra Lightweight winners:  Magzhan Shamshadin (m) /  Abiba Abuzhakynova (f)
 Half Lightweight winners:  Yeset Kuanov (m) /  Liliia Nugaeva (f)
 Lightweight winners:  Murodjon Yuldoshev (m) /  Yulia Kazarina (f)
 Half Middleweight winners:  Magomed Edilbiev (m) /  Aigul Bagautdinova (f)
 Middleweight winners:  Yersultan Muzapparov (m) /  Dali Liluashvili (f)
 Half Heavyweight winners:  Dmitry Dovgan (m) /  Marina Bukreeva (f)
 Heavyweight winners:  Yerassyl Kazhibayev (m) /  Daria Vladimirova (f)

Karate
TBD: 2021 World Karate Championships in Dubai, United Arab Emirates
2021 World Junior Karate Championships

Kendo
TBD: World Kendo Championship

Kickboxing

Kurash

TBD: 2021 World Kurash Championships

Lacrosse

Luge

 9 & 10 January: 2021 FIL European Luge Championships in  Sigulda
 Men's singles winner:  Felix Loch
 Women's singles winner:  Tatiana Ivanova
 Doubles winners:  (Andris Šics & Juris Šics)
 Team relay winners:  (Tatiana Ivanova, Semen Pavlichenko, Vsevolod Kashkin/Konstantin Korshunov)
 29 – 31 January: 2021 FIL World Luge Championships in  Königssee
 Men's singles winner:  Roman Repilov
 Men's sprint winner:  Nico Gleirscher
 Women's singles winner:  Julia Taubitz
 Women's sprint winner:  Julia Taubitz
 Doubles winners:  (Toni Eggert & Sascha Benecken)
 Doubles' sprint winners:  (Tobias Wendl & Tobias Arlt)
 Team relay winners:  (Madeleine Egle, David Gleirscher, Thomas Steu/Lorenz Koller)
 1 February: FIL Junior Natural Track European Championships in  Jaufental
 Men's Junior Singles winner:  Fabian Brunner 
 Women's Junior Singles winner:  Lisa Walch
 Doubles Juniors winners:  (Anton Gruber Genetti & Hannes Unterholzner)
 12 – 14 February: 2021 FIL World Luge Natural Track Championships in  Umhausen
 Men's Singles winner:  Thomas Kammerlander
 Women's Singles winner:  Evelin Lanthaler
 Doubles winners:  (Patrick Pigneter & Florian Clara)
 Team Relay winners:  (Evelin Lanthaler & Alex Gruber)

2020–21 Luge World Cup
 28 & 29 November 2020: WC #1 in  Innsbruck
 Men's singles winner:  Felix Loch
 Women's singles winner:  Julia Taubitz
 Doubles winners:  (Thomas Steu & Lorenz Koller)
 Team relay winners:  (Julia Taubitz, Felix Loch, Toni Eggert/Sascha Benecken)
 5 & 6 December 2020: WC #2 in  Altenberg
 Men's singles winner:  Felix Loch
 Women's singles winner:  Tatiana Ivanova
 Doubles winners:  (Thomas Steu & Lorenz Koller)
 Team relay winners:  (Andrea Vötter, Kevin Fischnaller, Ludwig Rieder/Patrick Rastner)
 12 & 13 December 2020: WC #3 in  Oberhof
 Men's singles winner:  Felix Loch
 Women's singles winner:  Dajana Eitberger
 Doubles winners:  (Toni Eggert & Sascha Benecken)
 Team relay winners:  (Dajana Eitberger, Felix Loch, Toni Eggert/Sascha Benecken)
 19 & 20 December 2020: WC #4 in  Winterberg
 Men's singles winner:  Felix Loch
 Women's singles winner:  Julia Taubitz
 Doubles winners:  (Tobias Wendl & Tobias Arlt)
 2 & 3 January: WC #5 in  Königsee
 Men's singles winner:  Felix Loch
 Women's singles winner:  Julia Taubitz
 Doubles winners:  (Toni Eggert & Sascha Benecken)
 Team relay winners:  (Madeleine Egle, Nico Gleirscher, Thomas Steu/Lorenz Koller)
 9 & 10 January: WC #6 in  Sigulda
 Men's singles winner:  Felix Loch
 Women's singles winner:  Tatiana Ivanova
 Doubles winners:  (Andris Šics & Juris Šics)
 Team relay winners:  (Tatiana Ivanova, Semen Pavlichenko, Vsevolod Kashkin/Konstantin Korshunov)
 16 & 17 January: WC #7 in  Oberhof
 Men's singles winner:  Felix Loch
 Women's Singles winner:  Natalie Geisenberger
 Doubles winners:  (Thomas Steu & Lorenz Koller)
 23 & 24 January: WC #8 in  Innsbruck
 Men's singles winner:  Felix Loch
 Women's Singles winner:  Natalie Geisenberger
 Doubles winners:  (Ludwig Rieder & Patrick Rastner)
 23 & 24 January: WC #9 in  St. Moritz (final)
 Men's Singles winner:  Nico Gleirscher
 Women's Singles winner:  Elīna leva Vītola
 Doubles winners:  (Mārtiņš Bots & Roberts Plūme)
 Team relay winners: cancelled due to heavy snowfall.

2020–21 Luge Sprint World Cup
 28 & 29 November: WC #1 in  Innsbruck
 Men's singles winner:  Felix Loch
 Women's singles winner:  Julia Taubitz
 Doubles winner:  (Thomas Steu & Lorenz Koller)
 19 & 20 December 2020: WC #2 in  Winterberg
 Men's singles winner:  Max Langenhan
 Women's singles winner:  Julia Taubitz
 Doubles winners:  (Toni Eggert & Sascha Benecken)
 23 & 24 January: WC #3 in  Innsbruck (final)
 Men's singles winner:  Semen Pavlichenko
 Women's singles winner:  Julia Taubitz
 Doubles winners:  (Andris Šics & Juris Šics)

2021 FIL Junior Luge World Cup
 5 January: WC #1 in  Obdach #1
 Men's singles winner:  Fabian Brunner
 Women's singles winner:  Lisa Walch
 Doubles winners:  (Anton Gruber Genetti & Hannes Unterholzner)
 6 January: WC #2 in  Obdach #2
 Men's singles winner:  Fabian Brunner
 Women's singles winner:  Lisa Walch
 Doubles winners:  (Maximilian Pichler & Dominik Peter Maier)
 9 & 10 January: WC #3 in  Umhausen
 Men's singles winner:  Fabian Brunner
 Women's singles winner:  Lisa Walch
 Doubles winners:  (Anton Gruber Genetti & Hannes Unterholzner)
 30 & 31 January: WC #4 in  Jaufental (final)
 Men's singles winner:  Fabian Brunner
 Women's singles winner:  Ricarda Ruetz
 Doubles winners:  (Anton Gruber Genetti & Hannes Unterholzner)

2020–21 Luge Natural World Cup
 17 December 2020: WC #1 in  Obdach #1
 Men's singles winner:  Michael Scheikl
 Women's singles winner:  Evelin Lanthaler
 Doubles winners:  (Patrick Pigneter & Florian Clara)
 18 & 19 December 2020: WC #2 in  Obdach #2
 Men's singles winner:  Michael Scheikl
 Women's singles winner:  Evelin Lanthaler
 Doubles winners:  (Patrick Pigneter & Florian Clara)
 Team winners:  (Evelin Lanthaler & Patrick Pigneter)
 14 – 17 January: WC #3 in  Passeier #1
 Men's singles winner:  Thomas Kammerlander
 Women's singles winner:  Evelin Lanthaler
 Doubles winners:  (Evelin Lanthaler & Patrick Pigneter)
 Men's Singles Nations Cup winner:  Mathias Troger
 14 – 17 January: WC #4 in  Passeier #2
 Men's singles winner:  Thomas Kammerlander
 Women's singles winner:  Evelin Lanthaler
 Doubles winners:  (Fabian Achenrainer & Simon Achenrainer)
 Team winners:  (Evelin Lanthaler & Patrick Pigneter)
 Men's Singles Nations Cup winner:  Florian Markt
 8 – 10 February: WC #5 in  Laas #1
 Men's singles winner:  Thomas Kammerlander
 Women's singles winner:  Evelin Lanthaler
 Doubles winners:  (Evelin Lanthaler & Patrick Pigneter)
 Men's Singles Nations Cup winner:  Florian Clara
 8 – 10 February: WC #6 in  Laas #2 (final)
 Men's singles winner:  Thomas Kammerlander
 Women's singles winner:  Evelin Lanthaler
 Doubles winners:  (Pavel Porshnev & Ivan Lazarev)

Modern Pentathlon
8–13 June: 2021 World Modern Pentathlon Championships in Cairo, Egypt
TBD: 2021 Modern Pentathlon World Cup
2021 Modern Pentathlon Junior World Championships
2021 Modern Pentathlon Youth World Championships

Motorsports

2021 Formula One World Championship
 28 March:  2021 Bahrain Grand Prix #1 Winner:  Lewis Hamilton (Mercedes)
 18 April:  2021 Emilia Romagna Grand Prix #2 Winner:  Max Verstappen (Red Bull Racing)
 2 May:  2021 Portuguese Grand Prix #3 Winner:  Lewis Hamilton (Mercedes)
 9 May:  2021 Spanish Grand Prix #4 Winner:  Lewis Hamilton (Mercedes)
 23 May:  2021 Monaco Grand Prix #5 Winner:  Max Verstappen (Red Bull Racing)
 6 June:  2021 Azerbaijan Grand Prix #6 Winner:  Sergio Perez (Red Bull Racing)
 20 June:  2021 French Grand Prix #7 Winner:  Max Verstappen (Red Bull Racing)
 27 June:  2021 Styrian Grand Prix #8 Winner:  Max Verstappen (Red Bull Racing)
 4 July:  2021 Austrian Grand Prix #9 Winner:  Max Verstappen (Red Bull Racing)
 18 July:  2021 British Grand Prix #10 Winner:  Lewis Hamilton (Mercedes)
 1 August:  2021 Hungarian Grand Prix #11 Winner:  Esteban Ocon (Alpine)
 29 August:  2021 Belgian Grand Prix #12 Winner:  Max Verstappen (Red Bull Racing)
 5 September:  2021 Dutch Grand Prix #13 Winner:  Max Verstappen (Red Bull Racing)
 12 September:  2021 Italian Grand Prix #14 Winner:  Daniel Ricciardo (McLaren)
 26 September:  2021 Russian Grand Prix #15 Winner:  Lewis Hamilton (Mercedes)
 10 October:  2021 Turkish Grand Prix #16 Winner:  Valtteri Bottas (Mercedes)
 24 October:  2021 United States Grand Prix #17 Winner:  Max Verstappen (Red Bull Racing)
 7 November:  2021 Mexico City Grand Prix #18 Winner:  Max Verstappen (Red Bull Racing)
 14 November:  2021 São Paulo Grand Prix #19 Winner:  Lewis Hamilton (Mercedes)
 21 November:  2021 Qatar Grand Prix #20 Winner:  Lewis Hamilton (Mercedes)
 5 December:  2021 Saudi Arabian Grand Prix #21 Winner:  Lewis Hamilton (Mercedes)
 12 December:  2021 Abu Dhabi Grand Prix #22 Winner:  Max Verstappen (Red Bull Racing)

2020–21 Formula E World Championship
 26 February: 2021 Diriyah ePrix #1 Winner:  Nyck de Vries (Mercedes-Benz EQ Formula E Team)
 27 February: 2021 Diriyah ePrix #2 Winner:  Sam Bird (Jaguar Racing)

2021 World Touring Car Cup
 14 – 16 May: #1 Round at the  Hungaroring
 21 – 23 May: #2 Round at the  Automotodróm Slovakia Ring
 3 – 5 June: #3 Round at the  Nürburgring
 25 – 27 June: #4 Round at the  Circuito Internacional de Vila Real
 9 – 11 July: #5 Round at the  Ciudad del Motor de Aragón
 8 – 11 October: #6 Round at the  Inje Speedium
 5 – 7 November: #7 Round at the  TBD place
 19 – 21 November: #8 Round at the  Guia Circuit (final)

2021 European Autocross Championship
 15 & 16 May: #1 Round in  Seelow
 5 & 6 June: #2 Round in  Mūša
 12 & 13 June: #3 Round in  Vilkyčiai
 26 & 27 June: #4 Round in  Matschenberg
 3 & 4 July: #5 Round in  Nová Paka
 17 & 18 July: #6 Round in  Saint-Georges-de-Montaigu
 31 July & August 1: #7 Round in  Toldijk
 21 & 22 August: #8 Round in  Přerov
 18 & 19 September: #9 Round in  Saint-Igny-de-Vers
 25 & 26 September: #10 Round in  Maggiora
 9 & 10 October: #11 Round in  Mollerussa (final)

2021 European Drag Racing Championship
 28 – 31 May: #1 Round at the  Santa Pod Raceway #1
 10 – 13 June: #2 Round at the  Tierp Arena #1
 8 – 10 July: #3 Round in  Kauhava (Top Fuel and Pro Modified Competitions only)
 12 – 15 August: #4 Round at the  Tierp Arena #2
 27 – 29 August: #5 Round at the  Hockenheimring
 9 – 12 September: #6 Round at the  Santa Pod Raceway #2 (final)

2021 World Rally Championship
 21 – 24 January: #1 Round in  Gap (Monte Carlo Rally) Winner:  Sébastien Ogier (Toyota Gazoo Racing WRT)

2021 European Rally Championship

2021 European Truck Racing Championship
 22 & 23 May: #1 Round at the  Misano
 12 & 13 June: #2 Round at the  Hungaroring
 17 & 18 July: #3 Round at the  Nürburgring
 28 & 29 August: #4 Round at the  Most
 11 & 12 September: #5 Round at the  Zolder
 25 & 26 September: #6 Round at the  Le Mans
 2 & 3 October: #7 Round at the  Jarama (final)

Dakar Rally
 3 – 15 January: 2021 Dakar Rally in 
 Trucks winner:  Dmitry Sotnikov (Kamaz Master)
 SSV/Light prototype winner:  Francisco López Contardo (South Racing Can-Am)
 Cars winner:  Stéphane Peterhansel (MINI John Cooper Works Rally – X-raid)
 Quads winner:  Manuel Andújar (Team 7240)
 Bikes winner:  Kevin Benavides (Monster Energy Honda Team)
 Classics winner:  Marc Douton (Team Sunhill-R)

2021 FIA World Cup for Cross-Country Bajas
 4 – 7 February: #1 Round in the  Baja Russia – Northern Forest Winners:  Vladimir Vasilyev & Alexey Kuzmich (G-Energy Team)
 18 – 20 February: #2 Round at the  Dubai International Baja Winners:  Yazeed Al-Rajhi &  Michael Orr (Overdrive SA)
 4 – 6 March: #3 Round at the  Sharqiya Baja Winners:  Yasir Seaidan &  Alexey Kuzmich (Race World)
 18 – 20 March: #4 Round at the  Jordan Baja
 23 & 24 July: #5 Round at the  Baja Aragón
 12 – 15 August: #6 Round at the  Hungarian Baja
 26 – 29 August: #7 Round at the  Baja Poland
 9 – 12 September: #8 Round at the  Italian Baja
 28 – 30 October: #9 Round at the  Baja Portalegre 500

2021 Extreme E Championship
 3 – 4 April: 2021 Desert X-Prix in  Al-'Ula
 Winners:  Johan Kristoffersson /  Molly Taylor ( Rosberg X Racing)
 29 – 30 May: 2021 Ocean X-Prix in  Lac Rose
 28 – 29 August: 2021 Arctic X-Prix in  Kangerlussuaq
 23 – 24 October: 2021 Amazon X-Prix in  Santarém
 11 – 12 December: 2021 Glacier X-Prix in  Ushuaia

Mountain running
22 May: the Gansu ultramarathon disaster in the Yellow River Stone Forest, China led 21 runners to die from hypothermia.
TBD: 2021 World Mountain Running Championships
TBD: 2021 World Long Distance Mountain Running Championships
TBD: 2021 IAU Trail World Championships
2021 World Mountain & Trail Running Championships

Muay Thai

TBD:2021 IFMA World Muaythai Championships

Multi-sport events 
23 July – 8 August: 2020 Summer Olympics in Tokyo, Japan 
24 August – 5 September: 2020 Summer Paralympics in Tokyo, Japan 
30 July – 8 August: 2021 World Police and Fire Games in Rotterdam, Netherlands 
August: 2021 Junior Pan American Games in Cali, Colombia 
10–19 September: 2021 Islamic Solidarity Games in Konya, Turkey 
21 November – 2 December: 2021 Southeast Asian Games in Hanoi, Vietnam 
11–18 December: 2021 European Youth Olympic Winter Festival in Vuokatti, Finland 
TBD: 2021 Winter Universiade in Lucerne, Switzerland 
TBD: 2021 Asian Winter Games
TBD: 2021 Winter Military World Games in Berchtesgaden, Germany 
TBD: 2021 Island Games in Guernsey 
TBD: 2021 Asian School's Sports Games
TBD: 2021 Lusophony Games in Luanda, Angola 
TBD: 2021 African Para Games
TBD: 2021 Asian Youth Para Games in Manama, Bahrain 
TBD: 2021 Central American Games in Santa Tecla, El Salvador 
TBD: 2021 Central Asian Games
TBD: 2021 European Universities Games
TBD: 2021 International Children's Games
TBD: 2021 International Children's Games (Winter)
TBD: 2021 Pan American Masters Games
TBD: 2021 Youth Parapan American Games
TBD: 2021 South American Beach Games
TBD: 2021 South American University Games
TBD: 2021 South American Youth Games
TBD: 2021 World Martial Arts Games
TBD: 2021 World Combat Games
TBD: 2021 World Masters Games postponed to 2022
TBD: 2021 World Urban Games
TBD: 2021 World Senior Games

Netball
 2 – 7 March: 2021 Constellation Cup in 
 25 – 31 March: SPAR Challenge 2021 in  Cape Town

Nordic Combined
 9 – 14 February: 2021 Nordic Junior World Ski Championships in  Vuokatti and Lahti
 Winners:  Johannes Lamparter (m) /  Gyda Westvold Hansen (f)
 Team winners:  (Eidar Johan Strøm, Marte Leinan Lund, Gyda Westvold Hansen, Andreas Skoglund)
22 February – 7 March: FIS Nordic World Ski Championships 2021 in  Obersdorf
 Men's winners:  Jarl Magnus Riiber (No. 1) /  Johannes Lamparter (No. 2)
 Women's winner:  Gyda Westvold Hansen
 Men's Ski Jump Team winners:  (Espen Bjørnstad, Jørgen Graabak, Jens Lurås Oftebro, Jarl Magnus Riiber)
 Men's Team Sprint winners:  (Johannes Lamparter & Lukas Greiderer)

2020–21 FIS Nordic Combined World Cup
 26–29 November 2020: WC #1 in  Ruka (Men's only)
 Winners:  Jarl Magnus Riiber (2 times) /  Jens Lurås Oftebro (No. 3)
 4 – 6 December 2020: WC #2 in  Lillehammer
 Event cancelled.
 17 – 20 December 2020: WC #3 in  Ramsau
 Men's winner:  Vinzenz Geiger (2 times)
 Women's winner:  Tara Geraghty-Moats
 2 & 3 January: WC #4 in  Otepää
 Event cancelled.
 14 – 17 January: WC #5 in  Val di Fiemme (Men's only)
 Winners:  Jarl Magnus Riiber (2 times)
 Team Sprint winners:  I (Eric Frenzel & Fabian Rießle)
 22 – 24 January: WC #6 in  Lahti (Men's only)
 Winner:  Akito Watabe
 Team Sprint winners:  I (Jørgen Graabak & Jarl Magnus Riiber)
 28 – 31 January: WC #7 in  Seefeld
 Winners:  Jarl Magnus Riiber (3 times)
 5 – 7 February: WC #8 in  Klingenthal
 Men's winner:  Vinzenz Geiger (2 times)

2020–21 FIS Nordic Combined Alpen Cup
 17 & 18 October 2020: OPA #1 in  Klingenthal
 Men's winner:  Fabian Hafner (2 times)
 Women's winners:  Jenny Nowak (No. 1) /  Sigrun Kleinrath (No. 2)
 19 & 20 December 2020: OPA #2 in  Seefeld
 Men's winners:  Samuel Lev (No. 1) /  Iacopo Bortolas (No. 2)
 Women's winner:  Sigrun Kleinrath (2 times)
 20 & 21 February: OPA #3 in  Ramsau (final)
 Men's winners:  Florian Kolb (No. 1) /  Marco Heinis (No. 2)

2020–21 FIS Nordic Combined Continental Cup
 11 – 13 December 2020: CC #1 in  Park City
 Men's winners:  Jakob Lange (No. 1) /  Julian Schmid (No. 2)
 Mass Start winner:  Julian Schmid
 15 – 17 January: CC #2 in  Klingenthal
 Men's winners:  Simen Tiller (2 times) /  Manuel Einkemmer (No. 2)
 22 – 24 January: CC #3 in  Eisenerz
 Men's winners:  Stefan Rettenegger (No. 1) /  Espen Andersen (No. 2) /  Leif Torbjørn Næsvold (No. 3)
 Women's winner:  Gyda Westvold Hansen (3 times)
 6 & 7 February: CC #4 in  Lahti
 Winners:  Andreas Skoglund (No. 1) /  Lars Buraas (No. 2)
 12 – 14 March: CC #5 in  Nizhny Tagil
 Men's winners:  Terence Weber (2 times)
 Women's winner:  Tara Geraghty-Moats (2 times)
 Mass Start winners:  Terence Weber (m) /  Tara Geraghty-Moats (f)
 12 – 14 March: CC #6 in  Prémanon
 Men's winners:  Stefan Rettenegger (2 times)
 Women's winner:  Annika Sieff (2 times)

Orienteering

4–9 July: 2021 World Orienteering Championships in Doksy, Czech Republic
TBD: 2021 World Ski Orienteering Championships
TBD: 2021 Orienteering World Cup
TBD: 2021 World Mountain Bike Orienteering Championships
TBD: 2021 World Trail Orienteering Championships
2021 Junior World Orienteering Championships

Pickleball
 Major League Pickleball (MLP) was established, the first professional level league format in the sport.
 7 – 11 April: 2021 Bainbridge Cup in Holly Hill, Florida
 6 – 14 December: 2021 Margaritaville USA Pickleball National Championships in Indian Wells, California

Racquetball

 29 November – 6 December: 2021 Racquetball World Championships in  Guatemala City
 Men's singles:  Alejandro Landa def.  Andrés Acuña, 15–6, 15–6.
 Women's singles:  Paola Longoria def.  Kelani Lawrence, 15–6, 15–1.
 Men's doubles:  Javier Mar & Rodrigo Montoya def.  Koko Keller & Conrrado Moscoso, 15–10, 15–9.
 Women's doubles:  Paola Longoria & Samantha Salas def.  Koko Keller & Conrrado Moscoso, 15–10, 15–9.

IRT
Grand Slam
 7 – 10 January: Suivant Consulting Pro Am in  Lilburn
 Singles:  Samuel Murray def.  Conrrado Moscoso, 15–7, 8–15, 11–9.
 Doubles:  Sudsy Monchik &  Alejandro Landa def.  Eduardo Garay &  Sebastian Franco, 15–12, 14–15, 11–6.

Tier 4
 17 – 20 September 2020: Atlanta Open in  Lilburn
 Singles:  Daniel de la Rosa def.  Alejandro Landa, 14–15, 15–11, 11–4.
 Doubles:  Juan Pablo Rodríguez &  Eduardo Garay def.  Maurice Miller &  Mario Mercado, 15–13, 15–8.

Tier 5
 25 & 26 July 2020: Georgia Games in  Lilburn
 Singles:  Eduardo Garay def.  Maurice Miller, 15–9, 15–11.
 23 & 24 October 2020: Warhawk Open at ULM in  Monroe
 Singles:  Maurice Miller def.  Zachary Williams, 15–8, 15–4.
 Doubles:  Maurice Miller &  Michael Miller Jr. def.  Michael Magana &  Zachary Williams, 15–14, 8–15, 11–3.
 12 – 15 November 2020: Southern Open in  Lilburn
 Singles:  Austin Cunningham def.  Timothy Baghurst, No show.
 4 – 6 December 2020: 30th Annual Turkey Shootout Racquetball Tournament in  Garden City
 1st.  Bradly Rogers, 2nd.  Nicholas Riffel, 3rd.  Jared Torres
 19 – 21 February: 2021 Peachtree OPEN in  Atlanta

Outdoor
 14 – 18 October 2020: 2020 3WallBall World Championships in  Las Vegas
 Singles:  Andree Parrilla def.  Marcelo Vargas Aguilar, 15–5, 15–8.
 Doubles:  Álvaro Beltrán &  Daniel de la Rosa def.  Ben Croft &  Kane Waselenchuk, 12–15, 15–9, 11–8.
 Mixed Doubles:  Daniel de la Rosa &  Michelle De La Rosa def.  Mario Mercado &  Adriana Riveros, 15–8, 15–0.

LPRT
Super Max Slam
 4 – 6 December 2020: TeamRoot.com Tournament in  Kansas City
 Singles:  Paola Longoria def.  Angelica Barrios, 15–5, 15–9.
 Doubles:  Natalia Méndez &  Valeria Centellas def.  Paola Longoria &  Samantha Salas, 15–14, 3–15, 11–2.

Outdoor
 15 – 19 October 2020: 2020 3WallBall World Championships in  Las Vegas
 Singles:  Paola Longoria def.  Rhonda Rajsich, 4–15, 15–4, 11–4.
 Doubles:  Paola Longoria &  Janel Tisinger def.  Carla Muñoz &  Michelle De La Rosa, 12–15, 15–9, 11–5.
 Mixed Doubles:  Daniel de la Rosa &  Michelle De La Rosa def.  Mario Mercado &  Adriana Riveros, 15–8, 15–0.

Roller skating

World Skate America
 4 – 14 February: Pan American of Clubs and Nations Championship in  Ibagué (Speed Skating)
 Clubs winner:  Tequendama AC
 Nations:  won overall gold medals and overall medal tally.
 22 – 28 February: Pan American of Nations Championship in  Bogotá (Inline Hockey)
 12 – 25 April: Pan American of Clubs and Nations Championship in  Guayaquil (Artistic Skating)
 16 – 26 September: Roller Hockey Pan American Championships in  Florida

Rowing
TBD: 2021 World Rowing Championships in Shanghai, China
TBD: 2021 World Rowing Cup
2021 World Rowing Junior Championships
2021 World Rowing U23 Championships

Rugby league 
 2021 Rugby League World Cup in England
2021 NRL season in Australasia
Super League XXVI in Europe

Rugby sevens

Rugby Union
 6 February – 20 March: ///// 2021 Six Nations Championship 
 5 – 13 March: // 2021 Women's Asia Rugby Championship
 18 September – 16 October: 2021 Rugby World Cup in 
2021 World Rugby Under 20 Championship

2020–21 Pro14
 2 October 2020 – 27 March: /// 2020–21 Pro14

ECPR
 12 December 2020 – 22 May: 2020–21 European Rugby Champions Cup (final in  Marseille)
 11 December 2020 – 21 May: 2020–21 European Rugby Challenge Cup (final in  Marseille)

Sailing
2020-2021 Vendee Globe
 16–21 August: 2021 Raceboard World Championships in  Riga
 22–28 August: 2021 Platu 25 World Championship in  Nida
 29 November – 6 December: 2021 Laser Radial World Championships in  Al-Musannah
 8–12 December: 2021 Melges 20 World Championship in  Miami

2021 World Match Racing Tour
 30 April – 2 May: Szczecin Match Race in  Szczecin

Savate

World Savate Combat Championships
 Men's −56 kg:  Ahmad Ferradji defeated  Rubén Batan
 Men's −70 kg:  Amine Feddal defeated  Oleksandr Brachykov
 Men's −75 kg:  Damien Fabregas defeated  Mykyta Radionov
 Men's −80 kg:  Alexis Nicolas defeated  Anton Chernikov
 Men's −85 kg:  Christopher Brugiroux defeated  Olivier Lafleur
 Women's −52 kg:  Marine Nicol defeated  Anastasia Konovalchuk
 Women's −56 kg:  Mathilde Mignier defeated  Lucija Regvat
 Women's −60 kg:  Sara Tebbakh defeated  Chiara Vincis
 Women's −65 kg:  Audrey Guillaume defeated  Jelena Sedoglavić

Shooting Sports

2021 ISSF World Cup
 22 February – 5 March: WC #1 in  Cairo
 Skeet winners:  Mykola Milchev (m) /  Danka Barteková (f)

2021 ISSF Grand Prix
 28 January – 6 February: ISSF Grand Prix Shotgun in  Rabat
 Skeet winners:  Rashid Saleh Hamad (m) /  Alina Fazylzyanova (f)
 Trap winners:  Maxim Kabatskiy (m) /  Ekaterina Subbotina (f)
 Mixed Trap winners:  1 (Alberto Fernández & Fátima Gálvez)
 Mixed Skeet winners:  1 (Natalia Vinogradova & Aleksei Skorobogatov)

2021 ISSF Junior World Cup

Ski jumping
 11–13 December 2020: FIS Ski Flying World Championships 2020 in  Planica
 Men's winner:  Karl Geiger
 Men's team winners:  (Daniel-André Tande, Johann André Forfang. Robert Johansson, Halvor Egner Granerud) 
 9 – 14 February: 2021 Nordic Junior World Ski Championships in  Vuokatti and Lahti
 Winners:  Niklas Bachlinger (m) /  Thea Minyan Bjørseth (f)
 Team winners:  (David Haagen, Daniel Tschofenig, Elias Medwed, Niklas Bachlinger) (m) /  (Hannah Wiegele, Vanessa Moharitsch, Julia Mühlbacher, Lisa Eder)
 22 February – 7 March: FIS Nordic World Ski Championships 2021 in  Obersdorf
 Men's winner:  Piotr Żyła (No. 1) /  Stefan Kraft (No. 2)
 Women's winners:  Ema Klinec (No. 1) /  Maren Lundby (No. 2)
 Men's Team winners:  (Pius Paschke, Severin Freund, Markus Eisenbichler, Karl Geiger)
 Women's Team winners:  (Daniela Iraschko-Stolz, Sophie Sorschag, Chiara Hölzl, Marita Kramer)
 Mixed Team winners:  (Katharina Althaus, Markus Eisenbichler, Anna Rupprecht, Karl Geiger)

Four Hills Tournament
 28 & 29 December 2020: FH #1 in  Oberstdorf
 Men's winner:  Karl Geiger
 31 December 2020 & 1 January: FH #2 in  Garmisch-Partenkirchen
 Men's winner:  Dawid Kubacki
 2 & 3 January: FH #3 in  Innsbruck
 Men's winner:  Kamil Stoch
 5 & 6 January: FH #4 in  Bischofshofen
 Men's winner:  Kamil Stoch
 Overall Men's winner:  Kamil Stoch

2020–21 FIS Ski Jumping World Cup
 20 – 22 November 2020: World Cup #1 in  Wisła (Men's only)
 Men's winner:  Markus Eisenbichler
 Men's team winners:  (Michael Hayböck, Philipp Aschenwald, Daniel Huber, Stefan Kraft)
 27 – 29 November 2020: World Cup #2 in  Ruka (Men's only)
 Men's winners:  Markus Eisenbichler (No. 1) /  Halvor Egner Granerud (No. 2)
 4–6 December 2020: World Cup #3 in  Nizhny Tagil (Men's only)
 Men's winner:  Halvor Egner Granerud (2 times)
 17 – 20 December 2020: World Cup #4 in  Ramsau (Women's only)
 Women's winner:  Marita Kramer
 18 – 20 December 2020: World Cup #5 in  Engelberg
 Men's winner:  Halvor Egner Granerud (2 times)
 8 – 10 January: World Cup #6 in  Titisee-Neustadt (Men's only)
 Men's winners:  Kamil Stoch (No. 1) /  Halvor Egner Granerud (No. 2)
 15 – 17 January: World Cup #7 in  Zakopane (Men's only)
 Men's winner:  Marius Lindvik
 Team winners:  (Michael Hayböck, Jan Hörl, Philipp Aschenwald, Daniel Huber)
 22 – 24 January: World Cup #8 in  Lahti (Men's only)
 Men's winner:  Robert Johansson
 Team winners:  (Marius Lindvik, Daniel-André Tande, Robert Johansson, Halvor Egner Granerud)
 22 – 24 January: World Cup #9 in  Ljubno ob Savinji (Women's only)
 Women's winner:  Eirin Maria Kvandal
 Team winners:  (Ema Klinec, Špela Rogelj, Urša Bogataj, Nika Križnar)
 29 – 31 January: World Cup #10 in  Willingen (Men's only)
 Men's winner:  Halvor Egner Granerud (2 times)
 30 & 31 January: World Cup #11 in  Titisee-Neustadt (Women's only)
 Women's winner:  Marita Kramer (2 times)
 4 – 7 February: World Cup #12 in  Hinzenbach (Women's only)
 Women's winners:  Nika Križnar (No. 1) /  Sara Takanashi (2 times)
 5 – 7 February: World Cup #13 in  Klingenthal
 Men's winner:  Halvor Egner Granerud (2 times)
 12 – 14 February: World Cup #14 in  Zakopane (Men's only)
 Men's winners:  Ryoyu Kobayashi (No. 1) /  Halvor Egner Granerud (No. 2)
 18 – 20 February: World Cup #15 in  Râșnov
 Men's winner:  Ryoyu Kobayashi
 Women's winners:  Nika Križnar (No. 1) /  Sara Takanashi (No. 2)
 Mixed Team winners:  (Maren Lundby, Daniel-André Tande, Silje Opseth, Halvor Egner Granerud)
 18 – 21 March: World Cup #16 in  Nizhny Tagil (Women's only)
 Winner:  Marita Kramer (2 times)

2020 FIS Ski Jumping Grand Prix
 14 & 15 August 2020: GP #1 in  Frenštát pod Radhoštěm (women's only)
 Winner:  Nika Križnar
 21 – 23 August 2020: GP #2 in  Wisła (Men's only)
 Winner #1:  Dawid Kubacki
 Winner #2:  Dawid Kubacki

2020–21 FIS Ski Jumping Continental Cup
 18 & 19 September 2020: COC #1 in  Wisła (Men's only)
 Winner:  Martin Hamann (2 times)
 18 – 20 December 2020: COC #2 in  Ruka (Men's only)
 Men's winners:  Stefan Rainer (2 times) /  Jan Hörl (No. 2)
 27 & 28 December 2020: COC #3 in  Engelberg (Men's only)
 Men's winners:  Jakub Wolny (No. 1) /  Maximilian Steiner (No. 2)
 16 & 17 January: COC #4 in  Innsbruck (Men's only)
 Men's winners:  Aleksander Zniszczoł (No. 1) /  Simon Ammann (No. 2)
 5 – 7 February: COC #5 in  Willingen (Men's only)
 Men's winner:  Ulrich Wohlgenannt (4 times)
 13 & 14 February: COC #6 in  Klingenthal (Men's only)
 Men's winner:  Markus Schiffner (2 times)
 20 & 21 February: COC #7 in  Brotterode
 Men's winners:  Stefan Hula Jr. (No. 1) /  Tomasz Pilch (No. 2)
 Women's winners:  Hannah Wiegele (2 times)
 13 & 14 March: COC #8 in  Zakopane
 Men's winners:  Ulrich Wohlgenannt (2 times)

2020–21 FIS Ski Jumping Alpen Cup
 12 & 13 September 2020: OPA #1 in  Berchtesgaden
 Winners #1:  Žak Mogel (m) /  Jerneja Repinc Zupančič
 Winners #2:  Niklas Bachlinger (m) /  Klára Ulrichová
 18 & 19 December 2020: OPA #2 in  Seefeld
 Men's winner:  Elias Medwed (2 times) 
 Women's winner:  Nika Prevc (2 times)
 23 & 24 January: OPA #3 in  Oberhof
 Men's winners:  David Haagen (No. 1) /  Daniel Tschofenig (No. 2)
 Women's winner:  Hannah Wiegele (2 times)
 20 & 21 February: OPA #4 in  Ramsau (Men's only)
 Men's winners:  Markus Müller (No. 1) /  Jonas Schuster (No. 2)
 12 – 14 March: OPA #5 in  Prémanon
 Men's winners:  Markus Müller (No. 1) /  Julijan Smid (No. 2)
 Women's winners:  Joséphine Pagnier (No. 1) /  Nika Prevc (No. 2)

2020–21 FIS Ski Cup
 3 & 4 October 2020: FC #1 in  Râșnov 
 Men's winners:  Yevhen Marusiak (No. 1) /  Vitaliy Kalinichenko (No. 2)
 Women's competitions are cancelled.
 11 – 13 December 2020: FC #2 in  Kandersteg
 Men's winner:  Niklas Bachlinger (2 times)
 Women's winners:  Julia Clair (No. 1) /  Joséphine Pagnier (No. 2)
 9 & 10 January: FC #3 in  Zakopane (Only men's)
 Men's winner:  Elias Medwed (2 times)
 19 & 20 January: FC #4 in  Szczyrk (Only men's)
 Men's winners:  Richard Freitag (No. 1) /  Philipp Raimund (No. 2)
 6 & 7 February: FC #5 in  Lahti (Only men's)
 Winners:  Hannes Landerer (No. 1) /  Dominik Peter (No. 2)
 20 & 21 February: FC #6 in  Villach
 Men's winner:  Maximilian Ortner (2 times)
 Women's winners:  Tinkara Komar (No. 1) /  Štěpánka Ptáčková (No. 2)
 26 & 27 February: FC #7 in  Oberhof (final)
 Men's winners:  Maximilian Ortner (No. 1) /  Francisco Mörth (No. 2)
 Women's winner:  Jerneja Repinc Zupančič (2 times)

Ski Mountaineering
 1 – 6 March:2021 World Championship of Ski Mountaineering in  La Massana

2020–21 ISMF World Cup
 19 & 20 December 2020: WC #1 in  Pontedilegno Tonale
 Sprint Race winners:  Thibault Anselmet (m) /  Marianne Fatton (f)
 Women's Vertical Long Race winner:  Axelle Mollaret

Snooker
2020–21 snooker season
World Seniors Tour
 19 – 22 August 2020: 2020 World Seniors Championship in  Sheffield
 In the final,  Jimmy White defeated  Ken Doherty, 5–4.

WR
 13 September – 30 October 2020: 2020 Championship League in  Milton Keynes
  Kyren Wilson defeated  Judd Trump, 3–1.
 21 – 27 September 2020: 2020 European Masters in  Milton Keynes
 In the final,  Mark Selby defeated  Martin Gould, 9–8.
 12 – 18 October 2020: 2020 English Open in  Milton Keynes
  Judd Trump defeated  Neil Robertson, 9–8.
 16 – 22 November 2020: 2020 Northern Ireland Open in  Milton Keynes
  Judd Trump defeated  Ronnie O'Sullivan, 9–7.
 23 November – 6 December 2020: 2020 UK Championship in  Milton Keynes
  Neil Robertson defeated  Judd Trump, 10–9.
 7 – 13 December 2020: 2020 Scottish Open in  Milton Keynes
  Mark Selby defeated  Ronnie O'Sullivan, 9–3.
 14 – 20 December 2020: 2020 World Grand Prix in  Milton Keynes
  Judd Trump defeated  Jack Lisowski, 10–7.
 17 April – 3 May: 2021 World Snooker Championship in  Sheffield

NR
 2 – 8 November 2020: 2020 Champion of Champions in  Milton Keynes
  Mark Allen defeated  Neil Robertson, 10–6.

Snowboard
 19 – 21 December 2020: FIS Snowboarding Junior World Championships in  Schönberg-Lachtal
 Parallel Slalom winners:  Dmitry Loginov (m) /  Sofia Nadyrshina (f)
 Parallel Giant Slalom winners:  Dmitry Loginov (m) /  Sofia Nadyrshina (f)
 9 February – 16 March: FIS Freestyle Ski and Snowboarding World Championships 2021 in  Idre,  Rogla,  Almaty and  Aspen
 Snowboard Cross winners:  Lucas Eguibar (m) /  Charlotte Bankes (f)
 Team Snowboard Cross winners:  (Jarryd Hughes & Belle Brockhoff)
 Parallel Giant Slalom winners:  Dmitry Loginov (m) /  Selina Jörg (f)
 Parallel Slalom winners:  Benjamin Karl (m) /  Sofia Nadyrshina (f)
 Slopestyle winners:  Marcus Kleveland (m) /  Zoi Sadowski-Synnott (f)
 Halfpipe winners:  Yuto Totsuka (m) /  Chloe Kim (f)
 Big Air winners:  Mark McMorris (m) /  Laurie Blouin (f)
 15 – 28 March: 2021 FIS Snowboarding Junior World Championships in  Krasnoyarsk
 Parallel giant slalom winners:  Iaroslav Stepanko (m) /  Sofia Nadyrshina (f)
 Parallel team winners:  I (Iaroslav Stepanko, Sofia Nadyrshina)
 Parallel slalom winners:  Vsevolod Martynov (m) /  Sofia Nadyrshina (f)
 Halfpipe winners:  Kaishu Nakagawa (m) /  Manon Kaji (f)
 Snowboard cross winners:  Éliot Grondin (m) /  Sára Strnadová (f)
 Snowboard cross team winners:  II (Daniil Donskikh, Valeriya Komnatnaya)
 Big air winners:  Taiga Hasegawa (m) /  Yura Murase (f)
 Slopestyle winners:  Rikuto Watanabe (m) /  Evy Poppe (f)

2020–21 FIS Snowboard World Cup
Snowboard Cross
 22 – 24 January: WC #1 in  Chiesa in Valmalenco
 Men's winners:  Glenn de Blois (No. 1) /  Alessandro Hämmerle (No. 2)
 Women's winners:  Michela Moioli (No. 1) /  Eva Samková (No. 2)
 16 – 18 February: WC #2 in  Reiteralm
 Winners:  Alessandro Hämmerle (m) /  Michela Moioli (f)
 3 – 5 March: WC #3 in  Bakuriani
 Men's winners:  Éliot Grondin (No. 1) /  Omar Visintin (No. 2)
 Women's winners:  Eva Samková (No. 1) /  Charlotte Bankes (No. 2)

Parallel Snowboard
 12 December 2020: WC #1 in  Cortina d'Ampezzo
 Winners:  Roland Fischnaller (m) /  Ester Ledecká (f)
 17 December 2020: WC #2 in  Carezza
 Winners:  Benjamin Karl (m) /  Ramona Theresia Hofmeister (f)
 9 January: WC #3 in  Scuol
 Winners:  Igor Sluev (m) /  Sofia Nadyrshina (f)
 12 & 13 January: WC #4 in  Bad Gastein
 Winners:  Aaron March (m) /  Sofia Nadyrshina (f)
 Team winners:  I (Andreas Prommegger & Claudia Riegler)
 30 January: WC #5 in  Moscow
 Winners:  Dmitriy Karlagachev (m) /  Daniela Ulbing (f)
 6 & 7 February: WC #6 in  Bannoye
 Parallel Giant Slalom winners:  Dmitry Loginov (m) /  Ramona Theresia Hofmeister (f)
 Parallel Slalom winners:  Dmitry Loginov (m) /  Julie Zogg (f)
 6 March: WC #7 in  Rogla
 Winners:  Žan Košir (m) /  Ramona Theresia Hofmeister (f)

Halfpipe
 19 – 23 January: WC #1 in  Laax
 Winners:  Yūto Totsuka (m) /  Chloe Kim (f)
 18 – 21 March: WC #2 in  Aspen
 Winners:  Yūto Totsuka (m) /  Chloe Kim (f)

Slopestyle
 19 – 23 January: WC #1 in  Laax
 Winners:  Niklas Mattsson (m) /  Jamie Anderson (f)
 19 & 20 March: WC #2 in  Aspen
 Winners:  Marcus Kleveland (m) /  Anna Gasser (f)

Big Air
 7 – 9 January: WC #1 in  Kreischberg (final)
 Winners:  Maxence Parrot (m) /  Zoi Sadowski-Synnott (f)

2020–21 FIS Snowboard Europa Cup
Parallel Snowboard
 16 & 17 January: EC #1 in  Simonhöhe
 Men's winners:  Alexander Payer (No. 1) /  Michał Nowaczyk (No. 2)
 Women's winners:  Tsubaki Miki (No. 1) /  Michelle Dekker (No. 2)
 23 & 24 January: EC #2 in  Davos
 Men's winners:  Cody Winters (No. 1) /  Lukas Mathies (No. 2)
 Women's winners:  Ladina Jenny (No. 1) /  Claudia Riegler (No. 2)
 6 & 7 February: EC #3 in  Lenzerheide
 Men's winners:  Dominik Burgstaller (No. 1) /  Črt Ikovic (No. 2)
 Women's winners:  Annamari Dancha (No. 1) /  Flurina Neva Bätschi (No. 2)
 27 & 28 February: EC #4 in  Villnöß
 Men's winners:  Gabriel Messner (No. 1) /  Aron Juritz (No. 2)
 Women's winners:  Lucia Dalmasso (No. 1) /  Larissa Gasser (No. 2)
 13 & 14 March: EC #5 in  Davos
 Parallel Giant Slalom winners:  Iaroslav Stepanko (m) /  Ladina Jenny (f)
 Parallel Slalom are cancelled here.

Slopestyle
 21 – 23 December 2020: EC #1 in  Corvatsch
 Winners:  Emil Zulian (m) /  Tess Coady (f)
 28 – 31 January: EC #2 in  Crans-Montana
 Winners:  Nicolas Huber (m) /  Evy Poppe (f)
 21 & 22 February: EC #3 in  Götschen
 Winners:  Leon Gütl (m) /  Livia Tannò (f)
 11 March: EC #4 in  Leysin
 Winners:  Jonas Junker (m) /  Mia Brookes (f)

Halfpipe
 28 – 31 January: EC #1 in  Crans-Montana
 Winners:  André Höflich (m) /  Elizabeth Hosking (f)
 8 March: EC #2 in  Leysin
 Winners:  Elias Allenspach (m) /  Elena Schütz (f)

Snowboard Cross
 26 January – 5 February: EC #1 in  Isola 2000
 Men's winners:  Merlin Surget (No. 1) /  Quentin Sodogas (No. 2) /  Matteo Menconi (No. 3)
 Women's winners:  Chloé Trespeuch (2 times) /  Muriel Jost (No. 3)
 12 & 13 February: EC #2 in  Chiesa in Valmalenco
 Men's winners:  Luca Hämmerle (No. 1) /  Julian Lüftner (No. 2)
 Women's winners:  Margaux Herpin (No. 1) /  Maeva Estevez (No. 2)
 27 & 28 February: EC #3 in  Reiteralm
 Men's winners:  Michael Perle (No. 1) /  Guillaume Herpin (No. 2)
 Women's winners:  Margaux Herpin (2 times)
 6 & 7 March: EC #4 in  Montafon/Gargellen
 Men's winners:  Guillaume Herpin (No. 1) /  Andreas Kroh (No. 2)
 Women's winners:  Margaux Herpin (No. 1) /  Livia Molodyh (No. 2)
 12 – 14 March: EC #5 in  Lenk im Simmental
 Men's winners:  Sebastian Jud (No. 1) / Second is cancelled
 Women's winners:  Audrey McManiman (No. 1) / Second is cancelled

Big Air
 8 & 9 February: EC #1 in  Kopaonik
 Winners:  Nicolas Huber (m) /  Maria Hidalgo (f)
 19 February: EC #2 in  Davos
 Winners:  Moritz Boll (m) /  Mia Brookes (f)
 21 & 22 February: EC #3 in  Götschen
 Winners:  Gabriel Adams (m) /  Ariane Burri (f)
 27 February: EC #4 in  Moscow
 Winners:  Nicolas Huber (m) /  Varvara Romanova (f)
 5 & 6 March: EC #5 in  Götschen
 Men's winners:  Ožbe Kuhar (No. 1) /  Niklas Huber (No. 2)
 Women's winners:  Eveliina Taka (No. 1) /  Amber Fennell (No. 2)

Softball

2021 U-23 Men's Softball World Cup
2021 WBSC U-12 Softball World Cup
2021 WBSC U-18 Women's Softball World Cup
2021 WBSC U-15 Women's Softball World Cup

2021 Little League Baseball World Series
Men
Women

2021 Junior League Baseball World Series
Women

2021 Senior League Baseball World Series
Men
Women

Speed Skating
 16 – 17 January: 2021 European Speed Skating Championships in  Heerenveen
 Allround winners:  Patrick Roest (m) /  Antoinette de Jong (f)
 Sprint winners:  Thomas Krol (m) /  Jutta Leerdam (f)
 22 – 24 January: 2021 European Short Track Speed Skating Championships in  Gdańsk
 500 m winners:  Konstantin Ivliev (m) /  Suzanne Schulting (f)
 1000 m winners:  Semion Elistratov (m) /  Suzanne Schulting (f)
 1500 m winners:  Semion Elistratov (m) /  Suzanne Schulting (f)
 Men's 5000 m Relay winners:  (Itzhak de Laat, Dylan Hoogerwerf, Sjinkie Knegt, Jens van 't Wout, Friso Emons)
 Women's 3000 m Relay winners:  (Gwendoline Daudet, Tifany Huot-Marchand, Aurélie Lévêque, Aurélie Monvoisin)
 11 – 14 February: 2021 World Single Distances Speed Skating Championships in  Heerenveen
 5 – 7 March: 2021 World Short Track Speed Skating Championships in  Dordrecht

2020–21 ISU Speed Skating World Cup
 22 – 24 January: 2020–21 ISU Speed Skating World Cup – World Cup 1 in  Heerenveen
 500 m #1 winners:  Dai Dai Ntab (m) /  Femke Kok (f)
 500 m #2 winners:  Artem Arefyev (m) /  Femke Kok (f)
 1000 m winners:  Thomas Krol (m) /  Brittany Bowe (f)
 1500 m winners:  Thomas Krol (m) /  Brittany Bowe (f)
 Women's 3000 m winner:  Irene Schouten
 Men's 5000 m winner:  Patrick Roest
 Mass Start winners:  Arjan Stroetinga (m) /  Irene Schouten (f)
 Team Pursuit winners:  (Sven Kramer, Chris Huizinga, Beau Snellink) (m) /  (Ivanie Blondin, Isabelle Weidemann, Valerie Maltais) (f)
 29 – 31 January: 2020–21 ISU Speed Skating World Cup – World Cup 2 in  Heerenveen
 500 m #1 winners:  Pavel Kulizhnikov (m) /  Femke Kok (f)
 500 m #2 winners:  Ronald Mulder (m) /  Femke Kok (f)
 1000 m winners:  Kai Verbij (m) /  Brittany Bowe (f)
 1500 m winners:  Thomas Krol (m) /  Brittany Bowe (f)
 Women's 3000 m winner:  Natalia Voronina
 Men's 5000 m winner:  Patrick Roest
 Mass Start winners:  Jorrit Bergsma (m) /  Irene Schouten (f)
 Team Pursuit winners:  (Sverre Lunde Pedersen, Allan Dahl Johansson, Hallgeir Engebråten) (m) /  (Ivanie Blondin, Isabelle Weidemann, Valerie Maltais) (f)

Speed skiing
 18 – 21 March: 2021 Speed Skiing World Championship in  Vars
 Event Cancelled.

2020–21 Speed Skiing World Cup
 22 – 24 January: WC #1 in  Gavarnie/Gèdre
 Event Cancelled.
 3 & 4 March: WC #2 in  Grandvalira/Grau Roig
 Event Cancelled.
 9 – 13 March: WC #3 in  Idre
 Speed Skiing #1 winners:  Simon Billy (m) /  Britta Backlund (f)
 Speed Skiing #2 winners:  Simon Billy (m) /  Valentina Greggio (f)
 Speed Skiing #3 winners:  Simon Billy (m) /  Britta Backlund (f)
 21 – 24 March: 2021 WC #4 in  Vars (final)
 Event Cancelled.

Sport climbing

2021 IFSC Climbing World Youth Championships

Squash
2021 World Junior Squash Championships

2020–21 PSA World Tour
World Tour Platinum
 10–17 October 2020: CIB Egyptian Squash Open in  Cairo
 Men's:  Ali Farag defeated  Tarek Momen, 11–8, 11–3, 11–4.
 Women's:  Nour El Sherbini defeated  Nouran Gohar, 11–9, 11–9, 11–6.
 1–7 November 2020: Qatar Classic in  Doha
 Men's:  Ali Farag defeated  Paul Coll, 11–8, 6–11, 11–9, 11–9.

World Tour Gold
 7 – 12 December 2020: CIB Black Ball Squash Open in  Cairo
 Women's:  Sarah-Jane Perry defeated  Hania El Hammamy, 4–11, 9–11, 11–9, 12–10, 11–9.
 13 – 18 December 2020: CIB Black Ball Squash Open in  Cairo
 Men's:  Fares Dessouky defeated  Ali Farag, 5–11, 8–11, 11–7, 11–8, 11–8.

World Tour Silver
 16–22 September 2020: Manchester Open in  Manchester
 Men's:  Mohamed El Shorbagy defeated  Karim Abdel Gawad, 9–11, 11–8, 11–7, 13–11.
 Women's:  Nour El Tayeb defeated  Camille Serme, 3–11, 11–8, 11–7, 11–3.

Surfing

2021 World Junior Surfing Championships

Synchronized skating

2021 ISU World Junior Synchronized Skating Championships

Table tennis

TBD: 2021 World Table Tennis Championships
TBD: 2021 World Team Table Tennis Championships
2021 World Junior Table Tennis Championships

Taekwondo

TBD: 2021 World Taekwondo Championships in Wuxi, China

Telemark skiing

 15 – 21 March: 2021 World Telemarking Championships and 2021 FIS Telemark Junior World Championships in  Melchsee-Frutt
 Senior Sprint winners:  Bastien Dayer (m) /  Amélie Wenger-Reymond (f)
 Junior Sprint winners:  Alexis Page (m) /  Kaja Bjørnstad Konow (f)
 Senior Parallel Sprint winners:  Trym Nygaard Løken (m) /  Amélie Wenger-Reymond (f)
 Junior Parallel Sprint winners:  Giacomo Bormolini (m) /  Kaja Bjørnstad Konow (f)
 Senior Parallel Sprint Team winners: 
 Junior Parallel Sprint Team winners: 
 Senior Classic winners:  Bastien Dayer (m) /  Amélie Wenger-Reymond (f)
 Junior Classic winners:  Charly Petex (m) /  Kaja Bjørnstad Konow (f)

2021 Telemark Skiing World Cup
 21 – 25 January: WC #1 in  Bad Hindelang/Oberjoch
 Men's Sprint winners:  Jure Aleš (No. 1) /  Nicolas Michel (No. 2)
 Women's Sprint winner:  Amélie Wenger-Reymond (2 times)
 Men's Parallel Sprint winners:  Bastien Dayer (No. 1) /  Trym Nygaard Løken (No. 2)
 Women's Parallel Sprint winners:  Beatrice Zimmermann (No. 1) /  Amélie Wenger-Reymond (No. 2)
 Men's Classic winners:  Noé Claye (No. 1) /  Nicolas Michel (No. 2)
 Women's Classic winner:  Amélie Wenger-Reymond (2 times)
 28 – 31 January: WC #2 in  Krvavec
 Event Cancelled.
 10 – 13 February: WC #3 in  Passy Plaine-Joux
 Men's Sprint winners:  Nicolas Michel (No. 1) /  Bastien Dayer (No. 2)
 Women's Sprint winner:  Amélie Wenger-Reymond (2 times)
 Men's Classic winners:  Bastien Dayer (2 times)
 Women's Classic winner:  Amélie Wenger-Reymond (2 times)
 8 & 9 March: WC #4 in  Saint-Gervais-les-Bains
 Event Cancelled.
 10 – 15 March: WC #5 in  Thyon/4 Vallèes
 Men's Sprint winner:  Bastien Dayer
 Women's Sprint winner:  Amélie Wenger-Reymond
 Men's Classic winner:  Trym Nygaard Løken
 Women's Classic winner:  Amélie Wenger-Reymond

Tennis

Grand Slam
 8 – 21 February: 2021 Australian Open in  Melbourne
 Men's Singles:  Novak Djokovic defeated  Daniil Medvedev, 7–5, 6–2, 6–2.
 Women's Singles:  Naomi Osaka defeated  Jennifer Brady, 6–4, 6–3.
 Men's Doubles:  Ivan Dodig &  Filip Polášek defeated  Rajeev Ram &  Joe Salisbury, 6–3, 6–4.
 Women's Doubles:  Elise Mertens &  Aryna Sabalenka defeated  Barbora Krejčíková &  Kateřina Siniaková, 6–2, 6–3.
 Mixed Doubles:  Barbora Krejčíková &  Rajeev Ram defeated  Samantha Stosur &  Matthew Ebden, 6–1, 6–4.
30 May – 12 June: 2021 French Open
28 June – 11 July: 2021 Wimbledon Championships
30 August – 12 September: 2021 U.S. Open

2021 ATP Tour
ATP Tour 250
 7 – 13 January: 2021 Delray Beach Open in  Delray Beach
 Singles:  Hubert Hurkacz defeated  Sebastian Korda, 6–3, 6–3.
 Doubles:  Ariel Behar &  Gonzalo Escobar defeated  Christian Harrison &  Ryan Harrison, 6–7(5–7), 7–6(7–4), [10–4].
 7 – 13 January: 2021 Antalya Open in  Antalya
 Singles:  Alex De Minaur defeated  Alexander Bublik, 2–0, ret.
 Doubles:  Nikola Mektić &  Mate Pavić defeated  Ivan Dodig &  Filip Polášek, 6–2, 6–4.
 1 – 7 February: 2021 Great Ocean Road Open in  Melbourne
 Singles:  Jannik Sinner defeated  Stefano Travaglia, 7–6(7–4), 6–4.
 Doubles:  Jamie Murray &  Bruno Soares defeated  Juan Sebastián Cabal &  Robert Farah, 6–3, 7–6(9–7).
 1 – 7 February: 2021 Murray River Open in  Melbourne
 Singles:  Dan Evans defeated  Félix Auger-Aliassime, 6–2, 6–3.
 Doubles:  Nikola Mektić &  Mate Pavić defeated  Jérémy Chardy &  Fabrice Martin, 7–6(7–2), 6–3.

Teams
 2 – 7 February: 2021 ATP Cup in  Melbourne
 In the final,  defeated , 2–0, to win their first ATP Cup.

2021 WTA Tour
WTA 500
 6 – 13 January: 2021 Abu Dhabi Women's Tennis Open in  Abu Dhabi
 Singles:  Aryna Sabalenka defeated  Veronika Kudermetova, 6–2, 6–2.
 Doubles:  Shuko Aoyama &  Ena Shibahara defeated  Hayley Carter &  Luisa Stefani, 7–6(7–5), 6–4.
 31 January – 7 February: 2021 Yarra Valley Classic in  Melbourne
 Singles:  Ashleigh Barty defeated  Garbiñe Muguruza, 7–6(7–3), 6–4.
 Doubles:  Shuko Aoyama &  Ena Shibahara defeated  Anna Kalinskaya &  Viktória Kužmová, 6–3, 6–4.
 31 January – 7 February: 2021 Gippsland Trophy in  Melbourne
 Singles:  Elise Mertens defeated  Kaia Kanepi, 6–4, 6–1.
 Doubles:  Barbora Krejčíková &  Kateřina Siniaková defeated  Chan Hao-ching &  Latisha Chan, 6–3, 7–6(7–4).
 3 – 7 February: 2021 Grampians Trophy in  Melbourne
 Singles:  Anett Kontaveit vs  Ann Li, The final was abandoned due to a delay in schedule.
 Doubles: Not was.

WTA 250
 13 – 19 February: 2021 Phillip Island Trophy in  Melbourne
 Singles:  Daria Kasatkina defeated  Marie Bouzková, 4–6, 6–2, 6–2.
 Doubles:  Ankita Raina &  Kamilla Rakhimova defeated  Anna Blinkova &  Anastasia Potapova, 2–6, 6–4, [10–7].

Triathlon

Volleyball

 23 September – 3 October: 2021 FIVB Volleyball Men's U21 World Championship
 24 August – 2 September: 2021 FIVB Volleyball Boys' U19 World Championship
 9–18 July 2021: 2021 FIVB Volleyball Women's U20 World Championship  defeated  3–0 to win their 2nd title.
 20–29 September 2021: 2021 FIVB Volleyball Girls' U18 World Championship

AVC
 29 August 29 – 5 September: 2021 Asian Women's Volleyball Championship
 12–19 September: 2021 Asian Men's Volleyball Championship

CAVB
 18 – 26 February: 2020 African Volleyball Championship U21 in  Cairo
 Group Stage Format: 1st. , 2nd. , 3rd. , 4th. 
 Egypt qualified at the 2021 FIVB Volleyball Men's U21 World Championship.
 1 – 9 March: Girls' Africa Volleyball Championship U18 and African Volleyball Championship U19 in  Abuja

CEV
 22 September 2020 – 1 May: 2020–21 CEV Champions League
 24 November 2020 – 1 May: 2020–21 CEV Women's Champions League
 8 October 2020 – 24 March: 2020–21 CEV Challenge Cup
 10 November 2020 – TBD 2020–21 CEV Women's Challenge Cup
 10 November 2020 – 23 March: 2020–21 Men's CEV Cup
 10 November 2020 – TBD: 2020–21 Women's CEV Cup

Regional leagues
 27 September 2020 – TBD: 2020–21 MEVZA League
 26 September 2020 – 27 February: 2020–21 Baltic Men Volleyball League

Water Polo

2021 FINA World Men's Youth Water Polo Championships 
 12 November 2019 – 1 July: 2020 FINA Men's Water Polo World League  defeated  9–8 to won their 3rd title.
 12 November 2019 – 19 June: 2020 FINA Women's Water Polo World League  defeated  14–8 to won their 14th title.

LEN
 11 November 2020 – 5 Jun: 2020–21 LEN Champions League (final 8 in  Hannover) Pro Recco defeated  FTC Telekom 9–6 to win their 9th title. 
 13 November 2020 – 8 May: 2020–21 LEN Euro Cup Szolnok won their first title.

Water Skiing & Wakeboarding

Weightlifting

 2 – 7 April: 2021 African Weightlifting Championships in  Antananarivo
 3 – 11 April: 2021 European Weightlifting Championships in  Moscow
 16 – 25 April: 2020 Asian Weightlifting Championships in  Tashkent
 18 – 25 April: 2020 Pan American Weightlifting Championships in  Santo Domingo
 30 April – 2 May: 7th European Union Cup in  Cottonera
 23 – 31 May: 2021 IWF Junior World Weightlifting Championships in  Jeddah
 7 – 17 December: 2021 World Weightlifting Championships in  Tashkent

Wrestling

2021 Wrestling Continental Championships
 Wrestling at the 2020 Summer Olympics in  Tokyo ⇒ 1–7 August
 2021 World Wrestling Championships in  Oslo ⇒ 2–10 October
 2021 European Wrestling Championships in  Warsaw ⇒ 19–25 April
 2021 Asian Wrestling Championships in  Almaty ⇒ 13–18 April
 2021 Pan American Wrestling Championships in  Guatemala City ⇒ 27–30 May
 2021 World Wrestling Olympic Qualification Tournament in  Sofia ⇒ 6–9 May
 2021 European Wrestling Olympic Qualification Tournament in  Budapest ⇒ 18–21 March
 2021 Asian Wrestling Olympic Qualification Tournament in  Almaty ⇒ 9–11 April
 2021 African & Oceania Wrestling Olympic Qualification Tournament in  Hammamet ⇒ 2–4 April
 2021 U23 World Wrestling Championships in  Belgrade ⇒ 1–7 November
 2021 European U23 Wrestling Championship in  Skopje ⇒ 17–23 May
 2021 World Junior Wrestling Championships in  Ufa ⇒ 16–22 August
 2021 European Juniors Wrestling Championships in  Dortmund ⇒ 28 June–4 July
 Wrestling at the 2021 Junior Pan American Games in  Cali ⇒ 1–4 December 
 2021 World Cadet Wrestling Championships in  Budapest ⇒ 19–25 July
 2021 European Cadets Wrestling Championships in  Samokov ⇒ 14–20 June
 2021 Veterans World Wrestling Championships in  Loutraki ⇒ 19–24 October

2021 Wrestling International tournament
 2021 Yasar Dogu Tournament in  Istanbul ⇒ 25–27 June 
 2021 Vehbi Emre & Hamit Kaplan Tournament in  Istanbul ⇒ 18–20 June 
 2021 Dan Kolov & Nikola Petrov Tournament in  Plovdiv ⇒ 8–11 April
 Golden Grand Prix Ivan Yarygin 2021 in  Krasnoyarsk ⇒ 27–30 May 
 2021 Grand Prix Zagreb Open in  Zagreb ⇒ 16–17 January
 Grand Prix de France Henri Deglane 2021 in  Nice ⇒ 15–17 January
 2021 Poland Open in  Warsaw ⇒ 8–13 June
 Matteo Pellicone Ranking Series 2021 in  Rome ⇒ 4–7 March

Wushu

2023: 2023 World Wushu Championships in  Dallas
TBD: 8th World Junior Wushu Championships in 
TBD: 4th World Taijiquan Championships in  Catania

References

 
Sports by year